

247001–247100 

|-bgcolor=#E9E9E9
| 247001 ||  || — || November 4, 1999 || Socorro || LINEAR || DOR || align=right | 2.4 km || 
|-id=002 bgcolor=#d6d6d6
| 247002 ||  || — || November 4, 1999 || Socorro || LINEAR || — || align=right | 5.8 km || 
|-id=003 bgcolor=#d6d6d6
| 247003 ||  || — || November 4, 1999 || Socorro || LINEAR || — || align=right | 3.2 km || 
|-id=004 bgcolor=#fefefe
| 247004 ||  || — || November 9, 1999 || Socorro || LINEAR || MAS || align=right | 1.2 km || 
|-id=005 bgcolor=#E9E9E9
| 247005 ||  || — || November 4, 1999 || Kitt Peak || Spacewatch || — || align=right | 2.1 km || 
|-id=006 bgcolor=#fefefe
| 247006 ||  || — || November 9, 1999 || Kitt Peak || Spacewatch || — || align=right | 2.2 km || 
|-id=007 bgcolor=#d6d6d6
| 247007 ||  || — || November 11, 1999 || Catalina || CSS || EOS || align=right | 4.0 km || 
|-id=008 bgcolor=#d6d6d6
| 247008 ||  || — || November 14, 1999 || Socorro || LINEAR || — || align=right | 5.1 km || 
|-id=009 bgcolor=#E9E9E9
| 247009 ||  || — || November 12, 1999 || Kitt Peak || Spacewatch || — || align=right | 3.0 km || 
|-id=010 bgcolor=#d6d6d6
| 247010 ||  || — || November 6, 1999 || Socorro || LINEAR || LIX || align=right | 5.1 km || 
|-id=011 bgcolor=#fefefe
| 247011 ||  || — || November 9, 1999 || Socorro || LINEAR || — || align=right | 1.2 km || 
|-id=012 bgcolor=#fefefe
| 247012 ||  || — || November 1, 1999 || Anderson Mesa || LONEOS || V || align=right | 1.2 km || 
|-id=013 bgcolor=#fefefe
| 247013 ||  || — || November 3, 1999 || Catalina || CSS || — || align=right | 2.1 km || 
|-id=014 bgcolor=#d6d6d6
| 247014 ||  || — || November 3, 1999 || Socorro || LINEAR || URS || align=right | 6.0 km || 
|-id=015 bgcolor=#d6d6d6
| 247015 ||  || — || November 5, 1999 || Socorro || LINEAR || — || align=right | 5.9 km || 
|-id=016 bgcolor=#d6d6d6
| 247016 ||  || — || November 28, 1999 || Kitt Peak || Spacewatch || EOS || align=right | 2.6 km || 
|-id=017 bgcolor=#fefefe
| 247017 ||  || — || December 2, 1999 || Kitt Peak || Spacewatch || V || align=right | 1.1 km || 
|-id=018 bgcolor=#d6d6d6
| 247018 ||  || — || December 7, 1999 || Socorro || LINEAR || ALA || align=right | 6.3 km || 
|-id=019 bgcolor=#C2FFFF
| 247019 ||  || — || December 7, 1999 || Socorro || LINEAR || L4 || align=right | 20 km || 
|-id=020 bgcolor=#d6d6d6
| 247020 ||  || — || December 4, 1999 || Catalina || CSS || — || align=right | 5.3 km || 
|-id=021 bgcolor=#d6d6d6
| 247021 ||  || — || December 12, 1999 || Socorro || LINEAR || BRA || align=right | 2.9 km || 
|-id=022 bgcolor=#E9E9E9
| 247022 ||  || — || December 12, 1999 || Socorro || LINEAR || — || align=right | 7.2 km || 
|-id=023 bgcolor=#fefefe
| 247023 ||  || — || December 2, 1999 || Kitt Peak || Spacewatch || NYS || align=right | 1.0 km || 
|-id=024 bgcolor=#E9E9E9
| 247024 ||  || — || December 4, 1999 || Kitt Peak || Spacewatch || — || align=right | 3.6 km || 
|-id=025 bgcolor=#E9E9E9
| 247025 ||  || — || December 27, 1999 || Kitt Peak || Spacewatch || — || align=right | 3.0 km || 
|-id=026 bgcolor=#E9E9E9
| 247026 ||  || — || December 31, 1999 || Kitt Peak || Spacewatch || — || align=right | 3.4 km || 
|-id=027 bgcolor=#d6d6d6
| 247027 ||  || — || January 3, 2000 || Socorro || LINEAR || — || align=right | 5.3 km || 
|-id=028 bgcolor=#d6d6d6
| 247028 ||  || — || January 5, 2000 || Socorro || LINEAR || — || align=right | 5.0 km || 
|-id=029 bgcolor=#FA8072
| 247029 ||  || — || January 3, 2000 || Socorro || LINEAR || H || align=right | 1.1 km || 
|-id=030 bgcolor=#E9E9E9
| 247030 ||  || — || January 5, 2000 || Socorro || LINEAR || BRU || align=right | 3.7 km || 
|-id=031 bgcolor=#d6d6d6
| 247031 ||  || — || January 7, 2000 || Kitt Peak || Spacewatch || THM || align=right | 3.6 km || 
|-id=032 bgcolor=#d6d6d6
| 247032 ||  || — || January 28, 2000 || Kitt Peak || Spacewatch || 7:4 || align=right | 4.1 km || 
|-id=033 bgcolor=#E9E9E9
| 247033 ||  || — || January 28, 2000 || Kitt Peak || Spacewatch || — || align=right | 2.2 km || 
|-id=034 bgcolor=#E9E9E9
| 247034 ||  || — || February 9, 2000 || Višnjan Observatory || K. Korlević || — || align=right | 1.8 km || 
|-id=035 bgcolor=#fefefe
| 247035 ||  || — || February 29, 2000 || Socorro || LINEAR || KLI || align=right | 3.2 km || 
|-id=036 bgcolor=#fefefe
| 247036 ||  || — || March 5, 2000 || Socorro || LINEAR || — || align=right | 1.3 km || 
|-id=037 bgcolor=#E9E9E9
| 247037 ||  || — || March 10, 2000 || Kitt Peak || Spacewatch || MAR || align=right | 1.7 km || 
|-id=038 bgcolor=#E9E9E9
| 247038 ||  || — || March 5, 2000 || Socorro || LINEAR || MIT || align=right | 3.5 km || 
|-id=039 bgcolor=#d6d6d6
| 247039 ||  || — || March 9, 2000 || Kitt Peak || Spacewatch || — || align=right | 3.0 km || 
|-id=040 bgcolor=#d6d6d6
| 247040 ||  || — || March 10, 2000 || Socorro || LINEAR || — || align=right | 6.6 km || 
|-id=041 bgcolor=#d6d6d6
| 247041 ||  || — || March 26, 2000 || Socorro || LINEAR || EUP || align=right | 7.4 km || 
|-id=042 bgcolor=#E9E9E9
| 247042 ||  || — || March 29, 2000 || Socorro || LINEAR || — || align=right | 3.9 km || 
|-id=043 bgcolor=#E9E9E9
| 247043 ||  || — || April 5, 2000 || Socorro || LINEAR || BRU || align=right | 5.5 km || 
|-id=044 bgcolor=#d6d6d6
| 247044 ||  || — || April 5, 2000 || Socorro || LINEAR || — || align=right | 4.5 km || 
|-id=045 bgcolor=#d6d6d6
| 247045 ||  || — || April 6, 2000 || Socorro || LINEAR || EOS || align=right | 3.4 km || 
|-id=046 bgcolor=#fefefe
| 247046 ||  || — || April 7, 2000 || Socorro || LINEAR || KLI || align=right | 2.9 km || 
|-id=047 bgcolor=#E9E9E9
| 247047 ||  || — || April 29, 2000 || Socorro || LINEAR || — || align=right | 3.9 km || 
|-id=048 bgcolor=#d6d6d6
| 247048 ||  || — || April 26, 2000 || Kitt Peak || Spacewatch || — || align=right | 5.6 km || 
|-id=049 bgcolor=#d6d6d6
| 247049 ||  || — || April 27, 2000 || Anderson Mesa || LONEOS || — || align=right | 3.4 km || 
|-id=050 bgcolor=#d6d6d6
| 247050 ||  || — || May 11, 2000 || Kitt Peak || Spacewatch || — || align=right | 5.1 km || 
|-id=051 bgcolor=#E9E9E9
| 247051 || 2000 LZ || — || June 2, 2000 || Ondřejov || P. Pravec, P. Kušnirák || — || align=right | 4.1 km || 
|-id=052 bgcolor=#E9E9E9
| 247052 ||  || — || June 1, 2000 || Kitt Peak || Spacewatch || INO || align=right | 2.0 km || 
|-id=053 bgcolor=#d6d6d6
| 247053 ||  || — || July 5, 2000 || Anderson Mesa || LONEOS || — || align=right | 3.0 km || 
|-id=054 bgcolor=#fefefe
| 247054 ||  || — || July 30, 2000 || Socorro || LINEAR || — || align=right | 1.2 km || 
|-id=055 bgcolor=#fefefe
| 247055 ||  || — || July 29, 2000 || Anderson Mesa || LONEOS || FLO || align=right | 1.1 km || 
|-id=056 bgcolor=#FA8072
| 247056 ||  || — || August 22, 2000 || Socorro || LINEAR || — || align=right | 1.8 km || 
|-id=057 bgcolor=#fefefe
| 247057 ||  || — || August 24, 2000 || Socorro || LINEAR || — || align=right data-sort-value="0.87" | 870 m || 
|-id=058 bgcolor=#d6d6d6
| 247058 ||  || — || August 28, 2000 || Socorro || LINEAR || TIR || align=right | 4.2 km || 
|-id=059 bgcolor=#E9E9E9
| 247059 ||  || — || August 24, 2000 || Socorro || LINEAR || MIT || align=right | 3.4 km || 
|-id=060 bgcolor=#d6d6d6
| 247060 ||  || — || August 28, 2000 || Socorro || LINEAR || — || align=right | 1.9 km || 
|-id=061 bgcolor=#E9E9E9
| 247061 ||  || — || August 28, 2000 || Socorro || LINEAR || — || align=right | 3.6 km || 
|-id=062 bgcolor=#FA8072
| 247062 ||  || — || August 25, 2000 || Socorro || LINEAR || — || align=right data-sort-value="0.83" | 830 m || 
|-id=063 bgcolor=#d6d6d6
| 247063 ||  || — || August 29, 2000 || Socorro || LINEAR || LIX || align=right | 5.2 km || 
|-id=064 bgcolor=#d6d6d6
| 247064 ||  || — || August 31, 2000 || Socorro || LINEAR || — || align=right | 5.2 km || 
|-id=065 bgcolor=#E9E9E9
| 247065 ||  || — || August 20, 2000 || Anderson Mesa || LONEOS || TIN || align=right | 3.4 km || 
|-id=066 bgcolor=#fefefe
| 247066 ||  || — || September 1, 2000 || Socorro || LINEAR || — || align=right | 1.1 km || 
|-id=067 bgcolor=#d6d6d6
| 247067 ||  || — || September 1, 2000 || Socorro || LINEAR || LIX || align=right | 4.8 km || 
|-id=068 bgcolor=#fefefe
| 247068 ||  || — || September 1, 2000 || Socorro || LINEAR || — || align=right | 1.0 km || 
|-id=069 bgcolor=#fefefe
| 247069 ||  || — || September 1, 2000 || Socorro || LINEAR || FLO || align=right | 1.1 km || 
|-id=070 bgcolor=#d6d6d6
| 247070 ||  || — || September 1, 2000 || Socorro || LINEAR || — || align=right | 6.8 km || 
|-id=071 bgcolor=#d6d6d6
| 247071 ||  || — || September 1, 2000 || Socorro || LINEAR || — || align=right | 4.6 km || 
|-id=072 bgcolor=#fefefe
| 247072 ||  || — || September 2, 2000 || Anderson Mesa || LONEOS || FLO || align=right | 1.3 km || 
|-id=073 bgcolor=#fefefe
| 247073 ||  || — || September 3, 2000 || Socorro || LINEAR || — || align=right | 1.3 km || 
|-id=074 bgcolor=#d6d6d6
| 247074 ||  || — || September 6, 2000 || Socorro || LINEAR || — || align=right | 6.1 km || 
|-id=075 bgcolor=#d6d6d6
| 247075 ||  || — || September 20, 2000 || Socorro || LINEAR || Tj (2.96) || align=right | 7.8 km || 
|-id=076 bgcolor=#d6d6d6
| 247076 ||  || — || September 23, 2000 || Socorro || LINEAR || EOS || align=right | 4.6 km || 
|-id=077 bgcolor=#fefefe
| 247077 ||  || — || September 24, 2000 || Socorro || LINEAR || — || align=right | 1.0 km || 
|-id=078 bgcolor=#fefefe
| 247078 ||  || — || September 24, 2000 || Socorro || LINEAR || — || align=right | 1.5 km || 
|-id=079 bgcolor=#fefefe
| 247079 ||  || — || September 23, 2000 || Socorro || LINEAR || FLO || align=right data-sort-value="0.79" | 790 m || 
|-id=080 bgcolor=#d6d6d6
| 247080 ||  || — || September 24, 2000 || Socorro || LINEAR || — || align=right | 2.9 km || 
|-id=081 bgcolor=#fefefe
| 247081 ||  || — || September 24, 2000 || Socorro || LINEAR || — || align=right | 1.1 km || 
|-id=082 bgcolor=#E9E9E9
| 247082 ||  || — || September 24, 2000 || Socorro || LINEAR || MAR || align=right | 2.8 km || 
|-id=083 bgcolor=#d6d6d6
| 247083 ||  || — || September 24, 2000 || Socorro || LINEAR || TEL || align=right | 2.2 km || 
|-id=084 bgcolor=#fefefe
| 247084 ||  || — || September 24, 2000 || Socorro || LINEAR || FLO || align=right | 1.4 km || 
|-id=085 bgcolor=#fefefe
| 247085 ||  || — || September 23, 2000 || Socorro || LINEAR || SUL || align=right | 2.8 km || 
|-id=086 bgcolor=#fefefe
| 247086 ||  || — || September 23, 2000 || Socorro || LINEAR || FLO || align=right data-sort-value="0.94" | 940 m || 
|-id=087 bgcolor=#FA8072
| 247087 ||  || — || September 24, 2000 || Socorro || LINEAR || — || align=right data-sort-value="0.99" | 990 m || 
|-id=088 bgcolor=#fefefe
| 247088 ||  || — || September 24, 2000 || Socorro || LINEAR || FLO || align=right data-sort-value="0.90" | 900 m || 
|-id=089 bgcolor=#d6d6d6
| 247089 ||  || — || September 21, 2000 || Socorro || LINEAR || — || align=right | 6.1 km || 
|-id=090 bgcolor=#fefefe
| 247090 ||  || — || September 23, 2000 || Socorro || LINEAR || — || align=right | 1.4 km || 
|-id=091 bgcolor=#E9E9E9
| 247091 ||  || — || September 28, 2000 || Socorro || LINEAR || — || align=right | 2.8 km || 
|-id=092 bgcolor=#fefefe
| 247092 ||  || — || September 21, 2000 || Haleakala || NEAT || — || align=right | 1.1 km || 
|-id=093 bgcolor=#d6d6d6
| 247093 ||  || — || September 27, 2000 || Socorro || LINEAR || TRP || align=right | 3.8 km || 
|-id=094 bgcolor=#fefefe
| 247094 ||  || — || September 24, 2000 || Socorro || LINEAR || — || align=right data-sort-value="0.86" | 860 m || 
|-id=095 bgcolor=#d6d6d6
| 247095 ||  || — || September 25, 2000 || Socorro || LINEAR || — || align=right | 2.7 km || 
|-id=096 bgcolor=#d6d6d6
| 247096 ||  || — || September 27, 2000 || Socorro || LINEAR || — || align=right | 5.0 km || 
|-id=097 bgcolor=#d6d6d6
| 247097 ||  || — || September 27, 2000 || Socorro || LINEAR || — || align=right | 3.7 km || 
|-id=098 bgcolor=#fefefe
| 247098 ||  || — || September 28, 2000 || Socorro || LINEAR || FLO || align=right data-sort-value="0.99" | 990 m || 
|-id=099 bgcolor=#d6d6d6
| 247099 ||  || — || September 28, 2000 || Socorro || LINEAR || LIX || align=right | 5.6 km || 
|-id=100 bgcolor=#fefefe
| 247100 ||  || — || September 30, 2000 || Socorro || LINEAR || FLO || align=right | 1.1 km || 
|}

247101–247200 

|-bgcolor=#d6d6d6
| 247101 ||  || — || September 28, 2000 || Socorro || LINEAR || — || align=right | 4.9 km || 
|-id=102 bgcolor=#C2FFFF
| 247102 ||  || — || September 28, 2000 || Socorro || LINEAR || L5 || align=right | 14 km || 
|-id=103 bgcolor=#d6d6d6
| 247103 ||  || — || September 30, 2000 || Socorro || LINEAR || — || align=right | 5.4 km || 
|-id=104 bgcolor=#fefefe
| 247104 ||  || — || September 21, 2000 || Kitt Peak || M. W. Buie || — || align=right data-sort-value="0.98" | 980 m || 
|-id=105 bgcolor=#d6d6d6
| 247105 ||  || — || September 30, 2000 || Anderson Mesa || LONEOS || — || align=right | 5.0 km || 
|-id=106 bgcolor=#fefefe
| 247106 ||  || — || October 1, 2000 || Socorro || LINEAR || — || align=right data-sort-value="0.95" | 950 m || 
|-id=107 bgcolor=#d6d6d6
| 247107 ||  || — || October 1, 2000 || Socorro || LINEAR || THM || align=right | 4.0 km || 
|-id=108 bgcolor=#fefefe
| 247108 ||  || — || October 2, 2000 || Socorro || LINEAR || — || align=right | 1.3 km || 
|-id=109 bgcolor=#E9E9E9
| 247109 ||  || — || October 2, 2000 || Anderson Mesa || LONEOS || — || align=right | 3.4 km || 
|-id=110 bgcolor=#fefefe
| 247110 ||  || — || October 2, 2000 || Socorro || LINEAR || — || align=right | 1.1 km || 
|-id=111 bgcolor=#d6d6d6
| 247111 ||  || — || October 3, 2000 || Socorro || LINEAR || — || align=right | 3.1 km || 
|-id=112 bgcolor=#d6d6d6
| 247112 || 2000 UL || — || October 19, 2000 || Needville || Needville Obs. || EOS || align=right | 2.9 km || 
|-id=113 bgcolor=#E9E9E9
| 247113 ||  || — || October 18, 2000 || Socorro || LINEAR || — || align=right | 3.4 km || 
|-id=114 bgcolor=#fefefe
| 247114 ||  || — || October 24, 2000 || Socorro || LINEAR || — || align=right | 1.2 km || 
|-id=115 bgcolor=#d6d6d6
| 247115 ||  || — || October 24, 2000 || Socorro || LINEAR || — || align=right | 2.2 km || 
|-id=116 bgcolor=#fefefe
| 247116 ||  || — || October 24, 2000 || Socorro || LINEAR || — || align=right | 1.9 km || 
|-id=117 bgcolor=#fefefe
| 247117 ||  || — || October 25, 2000 || Socorro || LINEAR || — || align=right | 1.3 km || 
|-id=118 bgcolor=#d6d6d6
| 247118 ||  || — || October 25, 2000 || Socorro || LINEAR || TRE || align=right | 3.9 km || 
|-id=119 bgcolor=#fefefe
| 247119 ||  || — || October 25, 2000 || Socorro || LINEAR || — || align=right | 1.3 km || 
|-id=120 bgcolor=#fefefe
| 247120 ||  || — || October 25, 2000 || Socorro || LINEAR || — || align=right | 1.1 km || 
|-id=121 bgcolor=#d6d6d6
| 247121 ||  || — || October 29, 2000 || Socorro || LINEAR || — || align=right | 3.9 km || 
|-id=122 bgcolor=#d6d6d6
| 247122 ||  || — || October 24, 2000 || Socorro || LINEAR || — || align=right | 4.1 km || 
|-id=123 bgcolor=#fefefe
| 247123 ||  || — || October 25, 2000 || Socorro || LINEAR || FLO || align=right | 1.0 km || 
|-id=124 bgcolor=#E9E9E9
| 247124 ||  || — || October 25, 2000 || Socorro || LINEAR || — || align=right | 2.2 km || 
|-id=125 bgcolor=#E9E9E9
| 247125 ||  || — || October 25, 2000 || Socorro || LINEAR || JUN || align=right | 1.9 km || 
|-id=126 bgcolor=#E9E9E9
| 247126 ||  || — || October 25, 2000 || Socorro || LINEAR || BRG || align=right | 3.3 km || 
|-id=127 bgcolor=#fefefe
| 247127 ||  || — || November 1, 2000 || Socorro || LINEAR || — || align=right data-sort-value="0.99" | 990 m || 
|-id=128 bgcolor=#d6d6d6
| 247128 ||  || — || November 1, 2000 || Socorro || LINEAR || — || align=right | 4.2 km || 
|-id=129 bgcolor=#d6d6d6
| 247129 ||  || — || November 1, 2000 || Socorro || LINEAR || — || align=right | 6.3 km || 
|-id=130 bgcolor=#E9E9E9
| 247130 ||  || — || November 1, 2000 || Socorro || LINEAR || — || align=right | 1.9 km || 
|-id=131 bgcolor=#fefefe
| 247131 ||  || — || November 1, 2000 || Socorro || LINEAR || NYS || align=right | 2.5 km || 
|-id=132 bgcolor=#d6d6d6
| 247132 ||  || — || November 21, 2000 || Socorro || LINEAR || ALA || align=right | 5.7 km || 
|-id=133 bgcolor=#d6d6d6
| 247133 ||  || — || November 20, 2000 || Socorro || LINEAR || — || align=right | 5.2 km || 
|-id=134 bgcolor=#d6d6d6
| 247134 ||  || — || November 20, 2000 || Socorro || LINEAR || — || align=right | 6.7 km || 
|-id=135 bgcolor=#d6d6d6
| 247135 ||  || — || November 19, 2000 || Socorro || LINEAR || — || align=right | 4.6 km || 
|-id=136 bgcolor=#d6d6d6
| 247136 ||  || — || November 20, 2000 || Socorro || LINEAR || URS || align=right | 6.9 km || 
|-id=137 bgcolor=#fefefe
| 247137 ||  || — || November 21, 2000 || Socorro || LINEAR || — || align=right | 2.1 km || 
|-id=138 bgcolor=#d6d6d6
| 247138 ||  || — || November 21, 2000 || Socorro || LINEAR || LIX || align=right | 6.4 km || 
|-id=139 bgcolor=#fefefe
| 247139 ||  || — || November 27, 2000 || Eskridge || G. Hug || ERI || align=right | 2.4 km || 
|-id=140 bgcolor=#E9E9E9
| 247140 ||  || — || November 20, 2000 || Socorro || LINEAR || — || align=right | 3.0 km || 
|-id=141 bgcolor=#d6d6d6
| 247141 ||  || — || November 29, 2000 || Socorro || LINEAR || — || align=right | 4.0 km || 
|-id=142 bgcolor=#E9E9E9
| 247142 ||  || — || November 30, 2000 || Socorro || LINEAR || GER || align=right | 3.3 km || 
|-id=143 bgcolor=#fefefe
| 247143 ||  || — || November 18, 2000 || Anderson Mesa || LONEOS || — || align=right | 1.0 km || 
|-id=144 bgcolor=#fefefe
| 247144 ||  || — || November 18, 2000 || Anderson Mesa || LONEOS || V || align=right data-sort-value="0.96" | 960 m || 
|-id=145 bgcolor=#d6d6d6
| 247145 ||  || — || December 1, 2000 || Socorro || LINEAR || — || align=right | 2.8 km || 
|-id=146 bgcolor=#E9E9E9
| 247146 ||  || — || December 4, 2000 || Socorro || LINEAR || GEF || align=right | 3.0 km || 
|-id=147 bgcolor=#d6d6d6
| 247147 ||  || — || December 4, 2000 || Socorro || LINEAR || LIX || align=right | 6.9 km || 
|-id=148 bgcolor=#d6d6d6
| 247148 ||  || — || December 1, 2000 || Haleakala || NEAT || — || align=right | 4.1 km || 
|-id=149 bgcolor=#d6d6d6
| 247149 ||  || — || December 4, 2000 || Socorro || LINEAR || — || align=right | 7.7 km || 
|-id=150 bgcolor=#d6d6d6
| 247150 ||  || — || December 4, 2000 || Socorro || LINEAR || — || align=right | 3.7 km || 
|-id=151 bgcolor=#d6d6d6
| 247151 ||  || — || December 8, 2000 || Bohyunsan || Y.-B. Jeon, B.-C. Lee || — || align=right | 3.2 km || 
|-id=152 bgcolor=#d6d6d6
| 247152 ||  || — || December 7, 2000 || Socorro || LINEAR || — || align=right | 6.8 km || 
|-id=153 bgcolor=#d6d6d6
| 247153 ||  || — || December 21, 2000 || Socorro || LINEAR || ALA || align=right | 5.9 km || 
|-id=154 bgcolor=#d6d6d6
| 247154 ||  || — || December 28, 2000 || Kitt Peak || Spacewatch || MEL || align=right | 6.0 km || 
|-id=155 bgcolor=#d6d6d6
| 247155 ||  || — || December 28, 2000 || Kitt Peak || Spacewatch || URS || align=right | 6.6 km || 
|-id=156 bgcolor=#FFC2E0
| 247156 ||  || — || December 23, 2000 || Socorro || LINEAR || AMO +1km || align=right | 1.7 km || 
|-id=157 bgcolor=#fefefe
| 247157 ||  || — || December 30, 2000 || Socorro || LINEAR || — || align=right | 1.3 km || 
|-id=158 bgcolor=#fefefe
| 247158 ||  || — || December 30, 2000 || Socorro || LINEAR || — || align=right | 1.4 km || 
|-id=159 bgcolor=#E9E9E9
| 247159 ||  || — || December 30, 2000 || Socorro || LINEAR || — || align=right | 5.0 km || 
|-id=160 bgcolor=#E9E9E9
| 247160 ||  || — || December 30, 2000 || Socorro || LINEAR || — || align=right | 5.0 km || 
|-id=161 bgcolor=#d6d6d6
| 247161 ||  || — || December 30, 2000 || Kitt Peak || Spacewatch || — || align=right | 4.4 km || 
|-id=162 bgcolor=#fefefe
| 247162 ||  || — || December 28, 2000 || Socorro || LINEAR || PHO || align=right | 1.2 km || 
|-id=163 bgcolor=#d6d6d6
| 247163 ||  || — || December 28, 2000 || Kitt Peak || Spacewatch || — || align=right | 6.5 km || 
|-id=164 bgcolor=#d6d6d6
| 247164 ||  || — || December 30, 2000 || Anderson Mesa || LONEOS || — || align=right | 5.3 km || 
|-id=165 bgcolor=#E9E9E9
| 247165 ||  || — || December 31, 2000 || Anderson Mesa || LONEOS || — || align=right | 6.3 km || 
|-id=166 bgcolor=#d6d6d6
| 247166 ||  || — || December 22, 2000 || Socorro || LINEAR || — || align=right | 3.9 km || 
|-id=167 bgcolor=#fefefe
| 247167 ||  || — || January 2, 2001 || Socorro || LINEAR || PHO || align=right | 2.1 km || 
|-id=168 bgcolor=#d6d6d6
| 247168 ||  || — || January 5, 2001 || Socorro || LINEAR || — || align=right | 5.8 km || 
|-id=169 bgcolor=#fefefe
| 247169 ||  || — || January 14, 2001 || Kitt Peak || Spacewatch || — || align=right | 1.3 km || 
|-id=170 bgcolor=#d6d6d6
| 247170 ||  || — || January 16, 2001 || Calar Alto || Calar Alto Obs. || — || align=right | 3.2 km || 
|-id=171 bgcolor=#d6d6d6
| 247171 ||  || — || January 21, 2001 || Oizumi || T. Kobayashi || — || align=right | 6.5 km || 
|-id=172 bgcolor=#E9E9E9
| 247172 ||  || — || January 19, 2001 || Socorro || LINEAR || — || align=right | 3.1 km || 
|-id=173 bgcolor=#d6d6d6
| 247173 ||  || — || January 19, 2001 || Socorro || LINEAR || ALA || align=right | 5.4 km || 
|-id=174 bgcolor=#E9E9E9
| 247174 ||  || — || January 21, 2001 || Socorro || LINEAR || — || align=right | 1.8 km || 
|-id=175 bgcolor=#d6d6d6
| 247175 ||  || — || January 20, 2001 || Haleakala || NEAT || EUP || align=right | 7.0 km || 
|-id=176 bgcolor=#E9E9E9
| 247176 ||  || — || January 16, 2001 || Haleakala || NEAT || — || align=right | 4.2 km || 
|-id=177 bgcolor=#d6d6d6
| 247177 ||  || — || February 2, 2001 || Socorro || LINEAR || — || align=right | 4.9 km || 
|-id=178 bgcolor=#d6d6d6
| 247178 ||  || — || February 13, 2001 || Socorro || LINEAR || — || align=right | 7.2 km || 
|-id=179 bgcolor=#FA8072
| 247179 ||  || — || February 17, 2001 || Socorro || LINEAR || PHO || align=right | 1.6 km || 
|-id=180 bgcolor=#fefefe
| 247180 ||  || — || February 19, 2001 || Socorro || LINEAR || — || align=right | 1.5 km || 
|-id=181 bgcolor=#E9E9E9
| 247181 ||  || — || February 16, 2001 || Socorro || LINEAR || — || align=right | 4.2 km || 
|-id=182 bgcolor=#d6d6d6
| 247182 ||  || — || February 19, 2001 || Socorro || LINEAR || HYG || align=right | 3.8 km || 
|-id=183 bgcolor=#E9E9E9
| 247183 ||  || — || February 25, 2001 || Haleakala || NEAT || BAR || align=right | 2.7 km || 
|-id=184 bgcolor=#fefefe
| 247184 ||  || — || February 20, 2001 || Socorro || LINEAR || — || align=right | 1.5 km || 
|-id=185 bgcolor=#E9E9E9
| 247185 ||  || — || March 1, 2001 || Socorro || LINEAR || — || align=right | 3.7 km || 
|-id=186 bgcolor=#d6d6d6
| 247186 ||  || — || March 14, 2001 || Anderson Mesa || LONEOS || URS || align=right | 6.7 km || 
|-id=187 bgcolor=#E9E9E9
| 247187 ||  || — || March 18, 2001 || Socorro || LINEAR || — || align=right | 1.8 km || 
|-id=188 bgcolor=#E9E9E9
| 247188 ||  || — || March 19, 2001 || Socorro || LINEAR || — || align=right | 2.3 km || 
|-id=189 bgcolor=#E9E9E9
| 247189 ||  || — || May 18, 2001 || Socorro || LINEAR || — || align=right | 2.6 km || 
|-id=190 bgcolor=#E9E9E9
| 247190 ||  || — || May 22, 2001 || Socorro || LINEAR || — || align=right | 3.1 km || 
|-id=191 bgcolor=#E9E9E9
| 247191 ||  || — || June 15, 2001 || Socorro || LINEAR || — || align=right | 2.7 km || 
|-id=192 bgcolor=#E9E9E9
| 247192 ||  || — || June 27, 2001 || Anderson Mesa || LONEOS || — || align=right | 2.8 km || 
|-id=193 bgcolor=#E9E9E9
| 247193 ||  || — || July 13, 2001 || Palomar || NEAT || — || align=right | 2.7 km || 
|-id=194 bgcolor=#E9E9E9
| 247194 ||  || — || July 12, 2001 || Palomar || NEAT || BRU || align=right | 3.4 km || 
|-id=195 bgcolor=#d6d6d6
| 247195 ||  || — || July 18, 2001 || Palomar || NEAT || BRA || align=right | 2.4 km || 
|-id=196 bgcolor=#d6d6d6
| 247196 ||  || — || July 20, 2001 || Palomar || NEAT || EUP || align=right | 7.0 km || 
|-id=197 bgcolor=#d6d6d6
| 247197 ||  || — || July 19, 2001 || Anderson Mesa || LONEOS || — || align=right | 6.4 km || 
|-id=198 bgcolor=#E9E9E9
| 247198 ||  || — || July 27, 2001 || Palomar || NEAT || — || align=right | 3.0 km || 
|-id=199 bgcolor=#E9E9E9
| 247199 ||  || — || July 25, 2001 || Haleakala || NEAT || — || align=right | 1.2 km || 
|-id=200 bgcolor=#fefefe
| 247200 ||  || — || July 30, 2001 || Socorro || LINEAR || — || align=right | 1.0 km || 
|}

247201–247300 

|-bgcolor=#E9E9E9
| 247201 ||  || — || July 31, 2001 || Kleť || Kleť Obs. || — || align=right | 3.2 km || 
|-id=202 bgcolor=#E9E9E9
| 247202 ||  || — || August 6, 2001 || Haleakala || NEAT || — || align=right | 2.0 km || 
|-id=203 bgcolor=#E9E9E9
| 247203 ||  || — || August 8, 2001 || Haleakala || NEAT || — || align=right | 2.5 km || 
|-id=204 bgcolor=#E9E9E9
| 247204 ||  || — || August 10, 2001 || Palomar || NEAT || — || align=right | 4.0 km || 
|-id=205 bgcolor=#E9E9E9
| 247205 ||  || — || August 10, 2001 || Palomar || NEAT || — || align=right | 4.0 km || 
|-id=206 bgcolor=#E9E9E9
| 247206 ||  || — || August 11, 2001 || Haleakala || NEAT || AEO || align=right | 2.0 km || 
|-id=207 bgcolor=#E9E9E9
| 247207 ||  || — || August 11, 2001 || Haleakala || NEAT || — || align=right | 2.0 km || 
|-id=208 bgcolor=#d6d6d6
| 247208 ||  || — || August 13, 2001 || San Marcello || A. Boattini, L. Tesi || TRP || align=right | 3.1 km || 
|-id=209 bgcolor=#E9E9E9
| 247209 ||  || — || August 16, 2001 || Socorro || LINEAR || WIT || align=right | 1.9 km || 
|-id=210 bgcolor=#fefefe
| 247210 ||  || — || August 16, 2001 || Socorro || LINEAR || — || align=right | 2.7 km || 
|-id=211 bgcolor=#E9E9E9
| 247211 ||  || — || August 16, 2001 || Socorro || LINEAR || INO || align=right | 2.1 km || 
|-id=212 bgcolor=#E9E9E9
| 247212 ||  || — || August 16, 2001 || Socorro || LINEAR || — || align=right | 3.4 km || 
|-id=213 bgcolor=#E9E9E9
| 247213 ||  || — || August 16, 2001 || Socorro || LINEAR || — || align=right | 1.9 km || 
|-id=214 bgcolor=#E9E9E9
| 247214 ||  || — || August 16, 2001 || Socorro || LINEAR || — || align=right | 3.8 km || 
|-id=215 bgcolor=#E9E9E9
| 247215 ||  || — || August 16, 2001 || Palomar || NEAT || — || align=right | 2.7 km || 
|-id=216 bgcolor=#E9E9E9
| 247216 ||  || — || August 22, 2001 || Socorro || LINEAR || ADE || align=right | 4.7 km || 
|-id=217 bgcolor=#E9E9E9
| 247217 ||  || — || August 21, 2001 || Palomar || NEAT || — || align=right | 2.1 km || 
|-id=218 bgcolor=#E9E9E9
| 247218 ||  || — || August 17, 2001 || Socorro || LINEAR || — || align=right | 2.1 km || 
|-id=219 bgcolor=#E9E9E9
| 247219 ||  || — || August 20, 2001 || Socorro || LINEAR || GEF || align=right | 1.8 km || 
|-id=220 bgcolor=#d6d6d6
| 247220 ||  || — || August 20, 2001 || Socorro || LINEAR || — || align=right | 6.1 km || 
|-id=221 bgcolor=#E9E9E9
| 247221 ||  || — || August 20, 2001 || Socorro || LINEAR || — || align=right | 3.0 km || 
|-id=222 bgcolor=#E9E9E9
| 247222 ||  || — || August 22, 2001 || Socorro || LINEAR || — || align=right | 1.6 km || 
|-id=223 bgcolor=#E9E9E9
| 247223 ||  || — || August 20, 2001 || Haleakala || NEAT || ADE || align=right | 2.1 km || 
|-id=224 bgcolor=#E9E9E9
| 247224 ||  || — || August 23, 2001 || Desert Eagle || W. K. Y. Yeung || CLO || align=right | 3.4 km || 
|-id=225 bgcolor=#E9E9E9
| 247225 ||  || — || August 23, 2001 || Anderson Mesa || LONEOS || — || align=right | 2.9 km || 
|-id=226 bgcolor=#E9E9E9
| 247226 ||  || — || August 23, 2001 || Anderson Mesa || LONEOS || PAE || align=right | 2.5 km || 
|-id=227 bgcolor=#E9E9E9
| 247227 ||  || — || August 25, 2001 || Socorro || LINEAR || — || align=right | 1.4 km || 
|-id=228 bgcolor=#E9E9E9
| 247228 ||  || — || August 22, 2001 || Socorro || LINEAR || AER || align=right | 2.7 km || 
|-id=229 bgcolor=#E9E9E9
| 247229 ||  || — || August 22, 2001 || Socorro || LINEAR || CLO || align=right | 1.7 km || 
|-id=230 bgcolor=#E9E9E9
| 247230 ||  || — || August 23, 2001 || Anderson Mesa || LONEOS || — || align=right | 2.8 km || 
|-id=231 bgcolor=#E9E9E9
| 247231 ||  || — || August 23, 2001 || Anderson Mesa || LONEOS || GEF || align=right | 3.0 km || 
|-id=232 bgcolor=#E9E9E9
| 247232 ||  || — || August 23, 2001 || Socorro || LINEAR || — || align=right | 2.4 km || 
|-id=233 bgcolor=#E9E9E9
| 247233 ||  || — || August 24, 2001 || Anderson Mesa || LONEOS || — || align=right | 2.7 km || 
|-id=234 bgcolor=#d6d6d6
| 247234 ||  || — || August 24, 2001 || Socorro || LINEAR || — || align=right | 5.7 km || 
|-id=235 bgcolor=#E9E9E9
| 247235 ||  || — || August 24, 2001 || Socorro || LINEAR || EUN || align=right | 2.0 km || 
|-id=236 bgcolor=#E9E9E9
| 247236 ||  || — || August 24, 2001 || Haleakala || NEAT || — || align=right | 2.1 km || 
|-id=237 bgcolor=#E9E9E9
| 247237 ||  || — || August 25, 2001 || Socorro || LINEAR || — || align=right | 2.6 km || 
|-id=238 bgcolor=#E9E9E9
| 247238 ||  || — || August 25, 2001 || Socorro || LINEAR || — || align=right | 3.9 km || 
|-id=239 bgcolor=#E9E9E9
| 247239 ||  || — || August 25, 2001 || Socorro || LINEAR || — || align=right | 3.6 km || 
|-id=240 bgcolor=#d6d6d6
| 247240 ||  || — || August 19, 2001 || Socorro || LINEAR || EUP || align=right | 6.7 km || 
|-id=241 bgcolor=#E9E9E9
| 247241 ||  || — || August 23, 2001 || Haleakala || NEAT || HOF || align=right | 3.4 km || 
|-id=242 bgcolor=#fefefe
| 247242 ||  || — || August 17, 2001 || Socorro || LINEAR || — || align=right | 2.5 km || 
|-id=243 bgcolor=#E9E9E9
| 247243 ||  || — || September 7, 2001 || Socorro || LINEAR || MRX || align=right | 1.8 km || 
|-id=244 bgcolor=#E9E9E9
| 247244 ||  || — || September 8, 2001 || Anderson Mesa || LONEOS || — || align=right | 2.5 km || 
|-id=245 bgcolor=#E9E9E9
| 247245 ||  || — || September 10, 2001 || Socorro || LINEAR || — || align=right | 3.6 km || 
|-id=246 bgcolor=#fefefe
| 247246 ||  || — || September 8, 2001 || Socorro || LINEAR || — || align=right | 2.8 km || 
|-id=247 bgcolor=#E9E9E9
| 247247 ||  || — || September 9, 2001 || Socorro || LINEAR || — || align=right | 2.6 km || 
|-id=248 bgcolor=#E9E9E9
| 247248 ||  || — || September 10, 2001 || Socorro || LINEAR || — || align=right | 2.5 km || 
|-id=249 bgcolor=#E9E9E9
| 247249 ||  || — || September 11, 2001 || Oakley || Oakley Obs. || — || align=right | 1.8 km || 
|-id=250 bgcolor=#E9E9E9
| 247250 ||  || — || September 11, 2001 || Socorro || LINEAR || TIN || align=right | 2.7 km || 
|-id=251 bgcolor=#d6d6d6
| 247251 ||  || — || September 10, 2001 || Socorro || LINEAR || VER || align=right | 4.3 km || 
|-id=252 bgcolor=#d6d6d6
| 247252 ||  || — || September 12, 2001 || Socorro || LINEAR || VER || align=right | 3.7 km || 
|-id=253 bgcolor=#E9E9E9
| 247253 ||  || — || September 12, 2001 || Socorro || LINEAR || — || align=right | 3.1 km || 
|-id=254 bgcolor=#E9E9E9
| 247254 ||  || — || September 14, 2001 || Palomar || NEAT || DOR || align=right | 3.2 km || 
|-id=255 bgcolor=#E9E9E9
| 247255 ||  || — || September 11, 2001 || Anderson Mesa || LONEOS || DOR || align=right | 3.1 km || 
|-id=256 bgcolor=#E9E9E9
| 247256 ||  || — || September 11, 2001 || Anderson Mesa || LONEOS || — || align=right | 2.4 km || 
|-id=257 bgcolor=#E9E9E9
| 247257 ||  || — || September 11, 2001 || Anderson Mesa || LONEOS || — || align=right | 3.4 km || 
|-id=258 bgcolor=#E9E9E9
| 247258 ||  || — || September 11, 2001 || Anderson Mesa || LONEOS || — || align=right | 2.7 km || 
|-id=259 bgcolor=#d6d6d6
| 247259 ||  || — || September 8, 2001 || Socorro || LINEAR || — || align=right | 6.6 km || 
|-id=260 bgcolor=#d6d6d6
| 247260 ||  || — || September 12, 2001 || Socorro || LINEAR || ALA || align=right | 6.3 km || 
|-id=261 bgcolor=#d6d6d6
| 247261 ||  || — || September 12, 2001 || Socorro || LINEAR || — || align=right | 6.3 km || 
|-id=262 bgcolor=#d6d6d6
| 247262 ||  || — || September 9, 2001 || Palomar || NEAT || — || align=right | 6.5 km || 
|-id=263 bgcolor=#E9E9E9
| 247263 ||  || — || September 10, 2001 || Anderson Mesa || LONEOS || — || align=right | 3.5 km || 
|-id=264 bgcolor=#fefefe
| 247264 ||  || — || September 19, 2001 || Fountain Hills || C. W. Juels, P. R. Holvorcem || — || align=right | 2.7 km || 
|-id=265 bgcolor=#E9E9E9
| 247265 ||  || — || September 16, 2001 || Socorro || LINEAR || DOR || align=right | 3.6 km || 
|-id=266 bgcolor=#d6d6d6
| 247266 ||  || — || September 16, 2001 || Socorro || LINEAR || — || align=right | 5.0 km || 
|-id=267 bgcolor=#E9E9E9
| 247267 ||  || — || September 16, 2001 || Socorro || LINEAR || — || align=right | 2.0 km || 
|-id=268 bgcolor=#E9E9E9
| 247268 ||  || — || September 17, 2001 || Socorro || LINEAR || — || align=right | 2.1 km || 
|-id=269 bgcolor=#E9E9E9
| 247269 ||  || — || September 17, 2001 || Socorro || LINEAR || — || align=right | 3.2 km || 
|-id=270 bgcolor=#E9E9E9
| 247270 ||  || — || September 20, 2001 || Socorro || LINEAR || AGN || align=right | 1.4 km || 
|-id=271 bgcolor=#E9E9E9
| 247271 ||  || — || September 20, 2001 || Socorro || LINEAR || HOF || align=right | 3.5 km || 
|-id=272 bgcolor=#E9E9E9
| 247272 ||  || — || September 20, 2001 || Socorro || LINEAR || — || align=right | 2.2 km || 
|-id=273 bgcolor=#E9E9E9
| 247273 ||  || — || September 20, 2001 || Socorro || LINEAR || MAR || align=right | 2.7 km || 
|-id=274 bgcolor=#d6d6d6
| 247274 ||  || — || September 16, 2001 || Socorro || LINEAR || — || align=right | 7.3 km || 
|-id=275 bgcolor=#E9E9E9
| 247275 ||  || — || September 16, 2001 || Socorro || LINEAR || — || align=right | 3.5 km || 
|-id=276 bgcolor=#d6d6d6
| 247276 ||  || — || September 16, 2001 || Socorro || LINEAR || — || align=right | 5.1 km || 
|-id=277 bgcolor=#E9E9E9
| 247277 ||  || — || September 16, 2001 || Socorro || LINEAR || — || align=right | 3.7 km || 
|-id=278 bgcolor=#d6d6d6
| 247278 ||  || — || September 16, 2001 || Socorro || LINEAR || EUP || align=right | 6.3 km || 
|-id=279 bgcolor=#d6d6d6
| 247279 ||  || — || September 17, 2001 || Socorro || LINEAR || — || align=right | 5.8 km || 
|-id=280 bgcolor=#E9E9E9
| 247280 ||  || — || September 17, 2001 || Socorro || LINEAR || — || align=right | 2.5 km || 
|-id=281 bgcolor=#d6d6d6
| 247281 ||  || — || September 17, 2001 || Socorro || LINEAR || — || align=right | 6.5 km || 
|-id=282 bgcolor=#E9E9E9
| 247282 ||  || — || September 19, 2001 || Socorro || LINEAR || — || align=right | 3.7 km || 
|-id=283 bgcolor=#d6d6d6
| 247283 ||  || — || September 19, 2001 || Socorro || LINEAR || slow || align=right | 6.4 km || 
|-id=284 bgcolor=#E9E9E9
| 247284 ||  || — || September 19, 2001 || Socorro || LINEAR || — || align=right | 3.1 km || 
|-id=285 bgcolor=#E9E9E9
| 247285 ||  || — || September 19, 2001 || Socorro || LINEAR || — || align=right | 4.0 km || 
|-id=286 bgcolor=#d6d6d6
| 247286 ||  || — || September 19, 2001 || Socorro || LINEAR || — || align=right | 4.1 km || 
|-id=287 bgcolor=#fefefe
| 247287 ||  || — || September 19, 2001 || Socorro || LINEAR || NYS || align=right | 2.5 km || 
|-id=288 bgcolor=#d6d6d6
| 247288 ||  || — || September 19, 2001 || Socorro || LINEAR || 7:4 || align=right | 6.0 km || 
|-id=289 bgcolor=#E9E9E9
| 247289 ||  || — || September 20, 2001 || Socorro || LINEAR || — || align=right | 3.9 km || 
|-id=290 bgcolor=#d6d6d6
| 247290 ||  || — || September 22, 2001 || Kitt Peak || Spacewatch || — || align=right | 3.4 km || 
|-id=291 bgcolor=#E9E9E9
| 247291 ||  || — || September 20, 2001 || Socorro || LINEAR || — || align=right | 3.5 km || 
|-id=292 bgcolor=#E9E9E9
| 247292 ||  || — || September 20, 2001 || Socorro || LINEAR || — || align=right | 2.0 km || 
|-id=293 bgcolor=#E9E9E9
| 247293 ||  || — || September 20, 2001 || Socorro || LINEAR || — || align=right | 2.5 km || 
|-id=294 bgcolor=#d6d6d6
| 247294 ||  || — || September 20, 2001 || Socorro || LINEAR || — || align=right | 4.4 km || 
|-id=295 bgcolor=#E9E9E9
| 247295 ||  || — || September 23, 2001 || Kitt Peak || Spacewatch || ADE || align=right | 1.9 km || 
|-id=296 bgcolor=#E9E9E9
| 247296 ||  || — || September 23, 2001 || Haleakala || NEAT || — || align=right | 2.3 km || 
|-id=297 bgcolor=#C2FFFF
| 247297 ||  || — || September 26, 2001 || Palomar || NEAT || L5 || align=right | 18 km || 
|-id=298 bgcolor=#d6d6d6
| 247298 ||  || — || October 14, 2001 || Socorro || LINEAR || — || align=right | 5.7 km || 
|-id=299 bgcolor=#E9E9E9
| 247299 ||  || — || October 15, 2001 || Desert Eagle || W. K. Y. Yeung || — || align=right | 2.1 km || 
|-id=300 bgcolor=#E9E9E9
| 247300 ||  || — || October 13, 2001 || Socorro || LINEAR || DOR || align=right | 3.6 km || 
|}

247301–247400 

|-bgcolor=#E9E9E9
| 247301 ||  || — || October 13, 2001 || Socorro || LINEAR || XIZ || align=right | 2.0 km || 
|-id=302 bgcolor=#E9E9E9
| 247302 ||  || — || October 13, 2001 || Socorro || LINEAR || — || align=right | 2.2 km || 
|-id=303 bgcolor=#E9E9E9
| 247303 ||  || — || October 13, 2001 || Socorro || LINEAR || DOR || align=right | 3.1 km || 
|-id=304 bgcolor=#E9E9E9
| 247304 ||  || — || October 13, 2001 || Socorro || LINEAR || — || align=right | 4.9 km || 
|-id=305 bgcolor=#E9E9E9
| 247305 ||  || — || October 14, 2001 || Socorro || LINEAR || — || align=right | 3.1 km || 
|-id=306 bgcolor=#d6d6d6
| 247306 ||  || — || October 14, 2001 || Socorro || LINEAR || — || align=right | 2.5 km || 
|-id=307 bgcolor=#E9E9E9
| 247307 ||  || — || October 14, 2001 || Socorro || LINEAR || — || align=right | 3.2 km || 
|-id=308 bgcolor=#d6d6d6
| 247308 ||  || — || October 15, 2001 || Socorro || LINEAR || — || align=right | 6.9 km || 
|-id=309 bgcolor=#d6d6d6
| 247309 ||  || — || October 15, 2001 || Socorro || LINEAR || — || align=right | 3.0 km || 
|-id=310 bgcolor=#d6d6d6
| 247310 ||  || — || October 12, 2001 || Haleakala || NEAT || EUP || align=right | 8.0 km || 
|-id=311 bgcolor=#E9E9E9
| 247311 ||  || — || October 12, 2001 || Haleakala || NEAT || GEF || align=right | 3.8 km || 
|-id=312 bgcolor=#d6d6d6
| 247312 ||  || — || October 11, 2001 || Palomar || NEAT || — || align=right | 3.2 km || 
|-id=313 bgcolor=#E9E9E9
| 247313 ||  || — || October 15, 2001 || Socorro || LINEAR || — || align=right | 2.2 km || 
|-id=314 bgcolor=#E9E9E9
| 247314 ||  || — || October 15, 2001 || Socorro || LINEAR || — || align=right | 3.0 km || 
|-id=315 bgcolor=#C2FFFF
| 247315 ||  || — || October 14, 2001 || Socorro || LINEAR || L5 || align=right | 16 km || 
|-id=316 bgcolor=#d6d6d6
| 247316 ||  || — || October 14, 2001 || Socorro || LINEAR || — || align=right | 5.6 km || 
|-id=317 bgcolor=#d6d6d6
| 247317 ||  || — || October 14, 2001 || Socorro || LINEAR || CRO || align=right | 4.8 km || 
|-id=318 bgcolor=#d6d6d6
| 247318 ||  || — || October 14, 2001 || Socorro || LINEAR || — || align=right | 3.6 km || 
|-id=319 bgcolor=#E9E9E9
| 247319 ||  || — || October 11, 2001 || Socorro || LINEAR || — || align=right | 2.7 km || 
|-id=320 bgcolor=#E9E9E9
| 247320 ||  || — || October 11, 2001 || Socorro || LINEAR || — || align=right | 2.3 km || 
|-id=321 bgcolor=#E9E9E9
| 247321 ||  || — || October 12, 2001 || Haleakala || NEAT || — || align=right | 3.0 km || 
|-id=322 bgcolor=#E9E9E9
| 247322 ||  || — || October 15, 2001 || Socorro || LINEAR || — || align=right | 2.6 km || 
|-id=323 bgcolor=#C2FFFF
| 247323 ||  || — || October 15, 2001 || Kitt Peak || Spacewatch || L5 || align=right | 13 km || 
|-id=324 bgcolor=#fefefe
| 247324 ||  || — || October 14, 2001 || Apache Point || SDSS || — || align=right | 2.0 km || 
|-id=325 bgcolor=#d6d6d6
| 247325 ||  || — || October 14, 2001 || Apache Point || SDSS || — || align=right | 2.3 km || 
|-id=326 bgcolor=#E9E9E9
| 247326 ||  || — || October 18, 2001 || Socorro || LINEAR || — || align=right | 2.0 km || 
|-id=327 bgcolor=#E9E9E9
| 247327 ||  || — || October 17, 2001 || Socorro || LINEAR || — || align=right | 2.7 km || 
|-id=328 bgcolor=#E9E9E9
| 247328 ||  || — || October 17, 2001 || Socorro || LINEAR || PAD || align=right | 3.1 km || 
|-id=329 bgcolor=#d6d6d6
| 247329 ||  || — || October 17, 2001 || Socorro || LINEAR || — || align=right | 6.0 km || 
|-id=330 bgcolor=#E9E9E9
| 247330 ||  || — || October 17, 2001 || Socorro || LINEAR || — || align=right | 2.8 km || 
|-id=331 bgcolor=#d6d6d6
| 247331 ||  || — || October 20, 2001 || Socorro || LINEAR || — || align=right | 5.5 km || 
|-id=332 bgcolor=#E9E9E9
| 247332 ||  || — || October 20, 2001 || Socorro || LINEAR || HNA || align=right | 2.7 km || 
|-id=333 bgcolor=#d6d6d6
| 247333 ||  || — || October 21, 2001 || Socorro || LINEAR || — || align=right | 5.3 km || 
|-id=334 bgcolor=#E9E9E9
| 247334 ||  || — || October 22, 2001 || Palomar || NEAT || — || align=right | 3.8 km || 
|-id=335 bgcolor=#E9E9E9
| 247335 ||  || — || October 22, 2001 || Socorro || LINEAR || AEO || align=right | 1.7 km || 
|-id=336 bgcolor=#fefefe
| 247336 ||  || — || October 23, 2001 || Socorro || LINEAR || NYS || align=right | 2.2 km || 
|-id=337 bgcolor=#E9E9E9
| 247337 ||  || — || October 23, 2001 || Socorro || LINEAR || — || align=right | 2.9 km || 
|-id=338 bgcolor=#E9E9E9
| 247338 ||  || — || October 19, 2001 || Socorro || LINEAR || — || align=right | 4.2 km || 
|-id=339 bgcolor=#d6d6d6
| 247339 ||  || — || October 19, 2001 || Palomar || NEAT || URS || align=right | 4.8 km || 
|-id=340 bgcolor=#E9E9E9
| 247340 ||  || — || October 20, 2001 || Socorro || LINEAR || DOR || align=right | 2.6 km || 
|-id=341 bgcolor=#C2FFFF
| 247341 ||  || — || October 20, 2001 || Haleakala || NEAT || L5010 || align=right | 16 km || 
|-id=342 bgcolor=#fefefe
| 247342 ||  || — || October 21, 2001 || Anderson Mesa || LONEOS || PHO || align=right | 3.4 km || 
|-id=343 bgcolor=#fefefe
| 247343 ||  || — || October 17, 2001 || Socorro || LINEAR || KLI || align=right | 4.2 km || 
|-id=344 bgcolor=#E9E9E9
| 247344 ||  || — || October 21, 2001 || Socorro || LINEAR || — || align=right | 2.7 km || 
|-id=345 bgcolor=#E9E9E9
| 247345 ||  || — || October 29, 2001 || Palomar || NEAT || — || align=right | 3.0 km || 
|-id=346 bgcolor=#E9E9E9
| 247346 ||  || — || November 5, 2001 || Eskridge || G. Hug || — || align=right | 3.5 km || 
|-id=347 bgcolor=#d6d6d6
| 247347 ||  || — || November 11, 2001 || Socorro || LINEAR || — || align=right | 6.8 km || 
|-id=348 bgcolor=#fefefe
| 247348 ||  || — || November 9, 2001 || Socorro || LINEAR || ERI || align=right | 3.3 km || 
|-id=349 bgcolor=#d6d6d6
| 247349 ||  || — || November 9, 2001 || Socorro || LINEAR || — || align=right | 7.0 km || 
|-id=350 bgcolor=#E9E9E9
| 247350 ||  || — || November 10, 2001 || Socorro || LINEAR || — || align=right | 4.5 km || 
|-id=351 bgcolor=#C2FFFF
| 247351 ||  || — || November 10, 2001 || Socorro || LINEAR || L5 || align=right | 16 km || 
|-id=352 bgcolor=#d6d6d6
| 247352 ||  || — || November 10, 2001 || Socorro || LINEAR || BRA || align=right | 2.5 km || 
|-id=353 bgcolor=#fefefe
| 247353 ||  || — || November 10, 2001 || Socorro || LINEAR || — || align=right | 1.2 km || 
|-id=354 bgcolor=#d6d6d6
| 247354 ||  || — || November 12, 2001 || Socorro || LINEAR || SYL7:4 || align=right | 6.9 km || 
|-id=355 bgcolor=#d6d6d6
| 247355 ||  || — || November 13, 2001 || Haleakala || NEAT || EUP || align=right | 5.1 km || 
|-id=356 bgcolor=#E9E9E9
| 247356 ||  || — || November 12, 2001 || Apache Point || SDSS || — || align=right | 3.1 km || 
|-id=357 bgcolor=#E9E9E9
| 247357 ||  || — || November 17, 2001 || Socorro || LINEAR || DOR || align=right | 3.7 km || 
|-id=358 bgcolor=#d6d6d6
| 247358 ||  || — || November 20, 2001 || Socorro || LINEAR || — || align=right | 5.9 km || 
|-id=359 bgcolor=#d6d6d6
| 247359 ||  || — || November 20, 2001 || Socorro || LINEAR || NAE || align=right | 3.3 km || 
|-id=360 bgcolor=#FFC2E0
| 247360 ||  || — || December 7, 2001 || Palomar || NEAT || APOPHAcritical || align=right data-sort-value="0.49" | 490 m || 
|-id=361 bgcolor=#E9E9E9
| 247361 ||  || — || December 8, 2001 || Socorro || LINEAR || GAL || align=right | 1.8 km || 
|-id=362 bgcolor=#fefefe
| 247362 ||  || — || December 11, 2001 || Socorro || LINEAR || H || align=right | 1.4 km || 
|-id=363 bgcolor=#fefefe
| 247363 ||  || — || December 9, 2001 || Socorro || LINEAR || ERI || align=right | 2.8 km || 
|-id=364 bgcolor=#E9E9E9
| 247364 ||  || — || December 9, 2001 || Socorro || LINEAR || GEF || align=right | 3.5 km || 
|-id=365 bgcolor=#E9E9E9
| 247365 ||  || — || December 9, 2001 || Socorro || LINEAR || — || align=right | 1.8 km || 
|-id=366 bgcolor=#d6d6d6
| 247366 ||  || — || December 9, 2001 || Socorro || LINEAR || — || align=right | 4.9 km || 
|-id=367 bgcolor=#E9E9E9
| 247367 ||  || — || December 10, 2001 || Socorro || LINEAR || AST || align=right | 2.9 km || 
|-id=368 bgcolor=#d6d6d6
| 247368 ||  || — || December 10, 2001 || Socorro || LINEAR || FIR || align=right | 5.1 km || 
|-id=369 bgcolor=#d6d6d6
| 247369 ||  || — || December 10, 2001 || Socorro || LINEAR || DUR || align=right | 4.1 km || 
|-id=370 bgcolor=#fefefe
| 247370 ||  || — || December 10, 2001 || Socorro || LINEAR || — || align=right | 2.8 km || 
|-id=371 bgcolor=#fefefe
| 247371 ||  || — || December 10, 2001 || Socorro || LINEAR || — || align=right | 1.8 km || 
|-id=372 bgcolor=#E9E9E9
| 247372 ||  || — || December 11, 2001 || Socorro || LINEAR || KON || align=right | 2.8 km || 
|-id=373 bgcolor=#E9E9E9
| 247373 ||  || — || December 11, 2001 || Socorro || LINEAR || — || align=right | 4.7 km || 
|-id=374 bgcolor=#E9E9E9
| 247374 ||  || — || December 11, 2001 || Socorro || LINEAR || — || align=right | 3.4 km || 
|-id=375 bgcolor=#E9E9E9
| 247375 ||  || — || December 14, 2001 || Socorro || LINEAR || ADE || align=right | 3.0 km || 
|-id=376 bgcolor=#fefefe
| 247376 ||  || — || December 14, 2001 || Socorro || LINEAR || — || align=right | 2.2 km || 
|-id=377 bgcolor=#d6d6d6
| 247377 ||  || — || December 15, 2001 || Socorro || LINEAR || — || align=right | 4.5 km || 
|-id=378 bgcolor=#fefefe
| 247378 ||  || — || December 15, 2001 || Socorro || LINEAR || — || align=right | 2.1 km || 
|-id=379 bgcolor=#fefefe
| 247379 ||  || — || December 15, 2001 || Socorro || LINEAR || ERI || align=right | 2.2 km || 
|-id=380 bgcolor=#d6d6d6
| 247380 ||  || — || December 15, 2001 || Socorro || LINEAR || — || align=right | 2.9 km || 
|-id=381 bgcolor=#E9E9E9
| 247381 ||  || — || December 11, 2001 || Kitt Peak || Spacewatch || PAD || align=right | 2.9 km || 
|-id=382 bgcolor=#d6d6d6
| 247382 ||  || — || December 18, 2001 || Socorro || LINEAR || — || align=right | 5.2 km || 
|-id=383 bgcolor=#d6d6d6
| 247383 ||  || — || December 18, 2001 || Socorro || LINEAR || — || align=right | 5.3 km || 
|-id=384 bgcolor=#d6d6d6
| 247384 ||  || — || December 18, 2001 || Socorro || LINEAR || — || align=right | 5.5 km || 
|-id=385 bgcolor=#d6d6d6
| 247385 ||  || — || December 18, 2001 || Palomar || NEAT || ALA || align=right | 6.8 km || 
|-id=386 bgcolor=#d6d6d6
| 247386 ||  || — || December 18, 2001 || Palomar || NEAT || — || align=right | 4.8 km || 
|-id=387 bgcolor=#E9E9E9
| 247387 ||  || — || December 17, 2001 || Socorro || LINEAR || — || align=right | 3.8 km || 
|-id=388 bgcolor=#E9E9E9
| 247388 ||  || — || December 17, 2001 || Socorro || LINEAR || DORslow || align=right | 5.3 km || 
|-id=389 bgcolor=#fefefe
| 247389 ||  || — || December 17, 2001 || Socorro || LINEAR || — || align=right | 2.9 km || 
|-id=390 bgcolor=#d6d6d6
| 247390 ||  || — || December 19, 2001 || Palomar || NEAT || TRP || align=right | 3.0 km || 
|-id=391 bgcolor=#FA8072
| 247391 ||  || — || January 9, 2002 || Socorro || LINEAR || H || align=right | 1.1 km || 
|-id=392 bgcolor=#d6d6d6
| 247392 ||  || — || January 12, 2002 || Kitt Peak || Spacewatch || — || align=right | 3.9 km || 
|-id=393 bgcolor=#E9E9E9
| 247393 ||  || — || January 12, 2002 || Socorro || LINEAR || MIT || align=right | 3.9 km || 
|-id=394 bgcolor=#d6d6d6
| 247394 ||  || — || January 8, 2002 || Socorro || LINEAR || — || align=right | 4.8 km || 
|-id=395 bgcolor=#d6d6d6
| 247395 ||  || — || January 9, 2002 || Socorro || LINEAR || — || align=right | 4.0 km || 
|-id=396 bgcolor=#d6d6d6
| 247396 ||  || — || January 9, 2002 || Socorro || LINEAR || — || align=right | 5.1 km || 
|-id=397 bgcolor=#d6d6d6
| 247397 ||  || — || January 13, 2002 || Socorro || LINEAR || — || align=right | 4.9 km || 
|-id=398 bgcolor=#d6d6d6
| 247398 ||  || — || January 13, 2002 || Socorro || LINEAR || — || align=right | 5.0 km || 
|-id=399 bgcolor=#d6d6d6
| 247399 ||  || — || January 8, 2002 || Socorro || LINEAR || — || align=right | 6.5 km || 
|-id=400 bgcolor=#d6d6d6
| 247400 ||  || — || January 8, 2002 || Apache Point || SDSS || ULA7:4 || align=right | 8.8 km || 
|}

247401–247500 

|-bgcolor=#fefefe
| 247401 ||  || — || January 13, 2002 || Socorro || LINEAR || — || align=right | 3.3 km || 
|-id=402 bgcolor=#fefefe
| 247402 ||  || — || January 19, 2002 || Socorro || LINEAR || — || align=right | 1.0 km || 
|-id=403 bgcolor=#fefefe
| 247403 ||  || — || January 21, 2002 || Palomar || NEAT || — || align=right | 2.0 km || 
|-id=404 bgcolor=#fefefe
| 247404 ||  || — || January 19, 2002 || Socorro || LINEAR || NYS || align=right data-sort-value="0.85" | 850 m || 
|-id=405 bgcolor=#d6d6d6
| 247405 ||  || — || February 3, 2002 || Palomar || NEAT || HIL3:2 || align=right | 6.4 km || 
|-id=406 bgcolor=#d6d6d6
| 247406 ||  || — || February 3, 2002 || Haleakala || NEAT || — || align=right | 6.0 km || 
|-id=407 bgcolor=#fefefe
| 247407 ||  || — || February 12, 2002 || Desert Eagle || W. K. Y. Yeung || — || align=right | 1.2 km || 
|-id=408 bgcolor=#d6d6d6
| 247408 ||  || — || February 7, 2002 || Socorro || LINEAR || — || align=right | 6.3 km || 
|-id=409 bgcolor=#C2FFFF
| 247409 ||  || — || February 7, 2002 || Socorro || LINEAR || L4ERY || align=right | 14 km || 
|-id=410 bgcolor=#E9E9E9
| 247410 ||  || — || February 7, 2002 || Socorro || LINEAR || JUN || align=right | 4.0 km || 
|-id=411 bgcolor=#fefefe
| 247411 ||  || — || February 7, 2002 || Socorro || LINEAR || FLO || align=right | 1.2 km || 
|-id=412 bgcolor=#d6d6d6
| 247412 ||  || — || February 7, 2002 || Socorro || LINEAR || — || align=right | 5.4 km || 
|-id=413 bgcolor=#E9E9E9
| 247413 ||  || — || February 7, 2002 || Socorro || LINEAR || — || align=right | 2.4 km || 
|-id=414 bgcolor=#E9E9E9
| 247414 ||  || — || February 10, 2002 || Socorro || LINEAR || — || align=right | 2.8 km || 
|-id=415 bgcolor=#E9E9E9
| 247415 ||  || — || February 10, 2002 || Socorro || LINEAR || — || align=right | 2.2 km || 
|-id=416 bgcolor=#fefefe
| 247416 ||  || — || February 10, 2002 || Socorro || LINEAR || NYS || align=right | 2.1 km || 
|-id=417 bgcolor=#d6d6d6
| 247417 ||  || — || February 11, 2002 || Socorro || LINEAR || — || align=right | 7.4 km || 
|-id=418 bgcolor=#fefefe
| 247418 ||  || — || February 8, 2002 || Kitt Peak || Spacewatch || FLO || align=right data-sort-value="0.55" | 550 m || 
|-id=419 bgcolor=#d6d6d6
| 247419 ||  || — || February 7, 2002 || Palomar || NEAT || — || align=right | 4.8 km || 
|-id=420 bgcolor=#d6d6d6
| 247420 ||  || — || February 6, 2002 || Kitt Peak || M. W. Buie || — || align=right | 5.4 km || 
|-id=421 bgcolor=#C2FFFF
| 247421 ||  || — || February 8, 2002 || Anderson Mesa || LONEOS || L4 || align=right | 17 km || 
|-id=422 bgcolor=#fefefe
| 247422 ||  || — || February 9, 2002 || Socorro || LINEAR || PHO || align=right | 3.2 km || 
|-id=423 bgcolor=#d6d6d6
| 247423 ||  || — || February 9, 2002 || Kitt Peak || Spacewatch || — || align=right | 5.1 km || 
|-id=424 bgcolor=#d6d6d6
| 247424 ||  || — || February 9, 2002 || Kitt Peak || Spacewatch || HYG || align=right | 5.4 km || 
|-id=425 bgcolor=#fefefe
| 247425 ||  || — || February 10, 2002 || Socorro || LINEAR || — || align=right | 3.6 km || 
|-id=426 bgcolor=#E9E9E9
| 247426 ||  || — || February 10, 2002 || Socorro || LINEAR || MIT || align=right | 2.8 km || 
|-id=427 bgcolor=#d6d6d6
| 247427 ||  || — || February 10, 2002 || Socorro || LINEAR || — || align=right | 5.6 km || 
|-id=428 bgcolor=#d6d6d6
| 247428 ||  || — || February 11, 2002 || Socorro || LINEAR || EMA || align=right | 4.1 km || 
|-id=429 bgcolor=#FA8072
| 247429 ||  || — || February 11, 2002 || Socorro || LINEAR || — || align=right | 1.4 km || 
|-id=430 bgcolor=#d6d6d6
| 247430 ||  || — || February 12, 2002 || Socorro || LINEAR || — || align=right | 3.5 km || 
|-id=431 bgcolor=#fefefe
| 247431 ||  || — || February 15, 2002 || Socorro || LINEAR || CIM || align=right | 4.1 km || 
|-id=432 bgcolor=#fefefe
| 247432 ||  || — || February 8, 2002 || Socorro || LINEAR || FLO || align=right | 1.1 km || 
|-id=433 bgcolor=#fefefe
| 247433 ||  || — || February 21, 2002 || Desert Moon || B. L. Stevens || FLO || align=right | 1.0 km || 
|-id=434 bgcolor=#d6d6d6
| 247434 ||  || — || February 21, 2002 || Socorro || LINEAR || EUP || align=right | 8.4 km || 
|-id=435 bgcolor=#E9E9E9
| 247435 ||  || — || February 16, 2002 || Palomar || NEAT || — || align=right | 2.9 km || 
|-id=436 bgcolor=#fefefe
| 247436 ||  || — || March 10, 2002 || Cima Ekar || ADAS || V || align=right data-sort-value="0.85" | 850 m || 
|-id=437 bgcolor=#C2FFFF
| 247437 ||  || — || March 12, 2002 || Palomar || NEAT || L4 || align=right | 17 km || 
|-id=438 bgcolor=#d6d6d6
| 247438 ||  || — || March 5, 2002 || Kitt Peak || Spacewatch || EOS || align=right | 3.7 km || 
|-id=439 bgcolor=#d6d6d6
| 247439 ||  || — || March 13, 2002 || Socorro || LINEAR || — || align=right | 4.2 km || 
|-id=440 bgcolor=#fefefe
| 247440 ||  || — || March 13, 2002 || Socorro || LINEAR || MAS || align=right | 1.1 km || 
|-id=441 bgcolor=#E9E9E9
| 247441 ||  || — || March 13, 2002 || Palomar || NEAT || — || align=right | 4.1 km || 
|-id=442 bgcolor=#E9E9E9
| 247442 ||  || — || March 2, 2002 || Palomar || NEAT || — || align=right | 2.1 km || 
|-id=443 bgcolor=#d6d6d6
| 247443 ||  || — || March 10, 2002 || Kitt Peak || Spacewatch || HYG || align=right | 4.1 km || 
|-id=444 bgcolor=#E9E9E9
| 247444 ||  || — || March 13, 2002 || Palomar || NEAT || PAD || align=right | 3.7 km || 
|-id=445 bgcolor=#d6d6d6
| 247445 ||  || — || March 13, 2002 || Socorro || LINEAR || — || align=right | 5.3 km || 
|-id=446 bgcolor=#fefefe
| 247446 ||  || — || March 16, 2002 || Socorro || LINEAR || — || align=right | 2.0 km || 
|-id=447 bgcolor=#d6d6d6
| 247447 ||  || — || April 14, 2002 || Socorro || LINEAR || — || align=right | 6.1 km || 
|-id=448 bgcolor=#fefefe
| 247448 ||  || — || April 14, 2002 || Socorro || LINEAR || NYS || align=right | 1.0 km || 
|-id=449 bgcolor=#fefefe
| 247449 ||  || — || April 2, 2002 || Kitt Peak || Spacewatch || MAS || align=right data-sort-value="0.92" | 920 m || 
|-id=450 bgcolor=#E9E9E9
| 247450 ||  || — || April 2, 2002 || Palomar || NEAT || ADE || align=right | 3.4 km || 
|-id=451 bgcolor=#fefefe
| 247451 ||  || — || April 3, 2002 || Kitt Peak || Spacewatch || — || align=right | 1.2 km || 
|-id=452 bgcolor=#fefefe
| 247452 ||  || — || April 4, 2002 || Palomar || NEAT || ERI || align=right | 2.5 km || 
|-id=453 bgcolor=#fefefe
| 247453 ||  || — || April 8, 2002 || Palomar || NEAT || MAS || align=right | 1.1 km || 
|-id=454 bgcolor=#E9E9E9
| 247454 ||  || — || April 8, 2002 || Palomar || NEAT || — || align=right | 2.9 km || 
|-id=455 bgcolor=#fefefe
| 247455 ||  || — || April 9, 2002 || Anderson Mesa || LONEOS || — || align=right | 2.3 km || 
|-id=456 bgcolor=#fefefe
| 247456 ||  || — || April 8, 2002 || Palomar || NEAT || V || align=right | 1.3 km || 
|-id=457 bgcolor=#fefefe
| 247457 ||  || — || April 10, 2002 || Socorro || LINEAR || ERI || align=right | 2.2 km || 
|-id=458 bgcolor=#E9E9E9
| 247458 ||  || — || April 10, 2002 || Socorro || LINEAR || MIS || align=right | 2.4 km || 
|-id=459 bgcolor=#fefefe
| 247459 ||  || — || April 11, 2002 || Socorro || LINEAR || — || align=right | 1.4 km || 
|-id=460 bgcolor=#E9E9E9
| 247460 ||  || — || April 12, 2002 || Palomar || NEAT || RAF || align=right | 1.7 km || 
|-id=461 bgcolor=#fefefe
| 247461 ||  || — || April 12, 2002 || Socorro || LINEAR || — || align=right | 1.1 km || 
|-id=462 bgcolor=#fefefe
| 247462 ||  || — || April 13, 2002 || Kitt Peak || Spacewatch || — || align=right | 1.2 km || 
|-id=463 bgcolor=#E9E9E9
| 247463 ||  || — || April 11, 2002 || Palomar || NEAT || — || align=right | 1.3 km || 
|-id=464 bgcolor=#d6d6d6
| 247464 ||  || — || April 9, 2002 || Socorro || LINEAR || 7:4 || align=right | 5.1 km || 
|-id=465 bgcolor=#E9E9E9
| 247465 ||  || — || April 22, 2002 || Socorro || LINEAR || — || align=right | 4.9 km || 
|-id=466 bgcolor=#d6d6d6
| 247466 ||  || — || May 5, 2002 || Palomar || NEAT || LUT || align=right | 7.7 km || 
|-id=467 bgcolor=#E9E9E9
| 247467 ||  || — || May 8, 2002 || Desert Eagle || W. K. Y. Yeung || — || align=right | 4.2 km || 
|-id=468 bgcolor=#d6d6d6
| 247468 ||  || — || May 7, 2002 || Palomar || NEAT || — || align=right | 4.5 km || 
|-id=469 bgcolor=#E9E9E9
| 247469 ||  || — || May 9, 2002 || Palomar || NEAT || — || align=right | 2.5 km || 
|-id=470 bgcolor=#E9E9E9
| 247470 ||  || — || May 8, 2002 || Socorro || LINEAR || — || align=right | 5.8 km || 
|-id=471 bgcolor=#fefefe
| 247471 ||  || — || May 9, 2002 || Socorro || LINEAR || — || align=right | 4.0 km || 
|-id=472 bgcolor=#E9E9E9
| 247472 ||  || — || May 8, 2002 || Socorro || LINEAR || — || align=right | 1.5 km || 
|-id=473 bgcolor=#fefefe
| 247473 ||  || — || May 12, 2002 || Reedy Creek || J. Broughton || — || align=right | 1.4 km || 
|-id=474 bgcolor=#fefefe
| 247474 ||  || — || May 11, 2002 || Socorro || LINEAR || ERI || align=right | 2.9 km || 
|-id=475 bgcolor=#fefefe
| 247475 ||  || — || May 10, 2002 || Socorro || LINEAR || V || align=right | 1.1 km || 
|-id=476 bgcolor=#d6d6d6
| 247476 ||  || — || May 5, 2002 || Palomar || NEAT || URS || align=right | 5.4 km || 
|-id=477 bgcolor=#E9E9E9
| 247477 ||  || — || May 8, 2002 || Socorro || LINEAR || — || align=right | 3.2 km || 
|-id=478 bgcolor=#fefefe
| 247478 ||  || — || May 10, 2002 || Palomar || NEAT || CHL || align=right | 2.6 km || 
|-id=479 bgcolor=#d6d6d6
| 247479 ||  || — || May 11, 2002 || Socorro || LINEAR || — || align=right | 7.5 km || 
|-id=480 bgcolor=#fefefe
| 247480 ||  || — || May 9, 2002 || Palomar || NEAT || — || align=right | 1.4 km || 
|-id=481 bgcolor=#d6d6d6
| 247481 ||  || — || May 16, 2002 || Fountain Hills || Fountain Hills Obs. || — || align=right | 8.3 km || 
|-id=482 bgcolor=#d6d6d6
| 247482 ||  || — || May 30, 2002 || Palomar || NEAT || — || align=right | 5.9 km || 
|-id=483 bgcolor=#fefefe
| 247483 ||  || — || June 6, 2002 || Socorro || LINEAR || — || align=right | 1.3 km || 
|-id=484 bgcolor=#FA8072
| 247484 ||  || — || June 6, 2002 || Socorro || LINEAR || H || align=right | 2.0 km || 
|-id=485 bgcolor=#E9E9E9
| 247485 ||  || — || June 9, 2002 || Socorro || LINEAR || — || align=right | 3.9 km || 
|-id=486 bgcolor=#fefefe
| 247486 ||  || — || June 3, 2002 || Palomar || NEAT || — || align=right | 1.3 km || 
|-id=487 bgcolor=#d6d6d6
| 247487 ||  || — || June 9, 2002 || Socorro || LINEAR || IMH || align=right | 6.3 km || 
|-id=488 bgcolor=#E9E9E9
| 247488 ||  || — || July 9, 2002 || Socorro || LINEAR || GER || align=right | 2.9 km || 
|-id=489 bgcolor=#E9E9E9
| 247489 ||  || — || July 5, 2002 || Kitt Peak || Spacewatch || — || align=right | 4.1 km || 
|-id=490 bgcolor=#E9E9E9
| 247490 ||  || — || July 9, 2002 || Socorro || LINEAR || — || align=right | 1.3 km || 
|-id=491 bgcolor=#E9E9E9
| 247491 ||  || — || July 5, 2002 || Palomar || NEAT || — || align=right | 2.7 km || 
|-id=492 bgcolor=#E9E9E9
| 247492 ||  || — || July 14, 2002 || Palomar || NEAT || — || align=right | 2.1 km || 
|-id=493 bgcolor=#d6d6d6
| 247493 ||  || — || July 12, 2002 || Palomar || NEAT || — || align=right | 4.1 km || 
|-id=494 bgcolor=#d6d6d6
| 247494 ||  || — || July 9, 2002 || Palomar || NEAT || — || align=right | 4.6 km || 
|-id=495 bgcolor=#fefefe
| 247495 ||  || — || July 15, 2002 || Palomar || NEAT || V || align=right | 1.3 km || 
|-id=496 bgcolor=#E9E9E9
| 247496 ||  || — || July 17, 2002 || Socorro || LINEAR || JUN || align=right | 2.5 km || 
|-id=497 bgcolor=#E9E9E9
| 247497 ||  || — || July 18, 2002 || Socorro || LINEAR || — || align=right | 1.3 km || 
|-id=498 bgcolor=#d6d6d6
| 247498 ||  || — || July 23, 2002 || Palomar || NEAT || — || align=right | 5.3 km || 
|-id=499 bgcolor=#d6d6d6
| 247499 ||  || — || July 18, 2002 || Palomar || NEAT || — || align=right | 3.9 km || 
|-id=500 bgcolor=#d6d6d6
| 247500 ||  || — || August 6, 2002 || Palomar || NEAT || Tj (2.94) || align=right | 5.0 km || 
|}

247501–247600 

|-bgcolor=#E9E9E9
| 247501 ||  || — || August 4, 2002 || Socorro || LINEAR || JUN || align=right | 2.4 km || 
|-id=502 bgcolor=#fefefe
| 247502 ||  || — || August 10, 2002 || Socorro || LINEAR || H || align=right data-sort-value="0.75" | 750 m || 
|-id=503 bgcolor=#d6d6d6
| 247503 ||  || — || August 10, 2002 || Socorro || LINEAR || EUP || align=right | 5.6 km || 
|-id=504 bgcolor=#E9E9E9
| 247504 ||  || — || August 11, 2002 || Socorro || LINEAR || — || align=right | 1.4 km || 
|-id=505 bgcolor=#d6d6d6
| 247505 ||  || — || August 11, 2002 || Socorro || LINEAR || — || align=right | 7.4 km || 
|-id=506 bgcolor=#fefefe
| 247506 ||  || — || August 14, 2002 || Socorro || LINEAR || — || align=right | 3.3 km || 
|-id=507 bgcolor=#d6d6d6
| 247507 ||  || — || August 12, 2002 || Socorro || LINEAR || Tj (2.94) || align=right | 7.1 km || 
|-id=508 bgcolor=#d6d6d6
| 247508 ||  || — || August 12, 2002 || Socorro || LINEAR || — || align=right | 6.1 km || 
|-id=509 bgcolor=#E9E9E9
| 247509 ||  || — || August 13, 2002 || Anderson Mesa || LONEOS || — || align=right | 3.5 km || 
|-id=510 bgcolor=#d6d6d6
| 247510 ||  || — || August 13, 2002 || Anderson Mesa || LONEOS || — || align=right | 5.9 km || 
|-id=511 bgcolor=#E9E9E9
| 247511 ||  || — || August 13, 2002 || Socorro || LINEAR || — || align=right | 4.2 km || 
|-id=512 bgcolor=#d6d6d6
| 247512 ||  || — || August 13, 2002 || Anderson Mesa || LONEOS || — || align=right | 4.8 km || 
|-id=513 bgcolor=#E9E9E9
| 247513 ||  || — || August 14, 2002 || Socorro || LINEAR || — || align=right | 1.1 km || 
|-id=514 bgcolor=#E9E9E9
| 247514 ||  || — || August 8, 2002 || Anderson Mesa || LONEOS || BRU || align=right | 5.2 km || 
|-id=515 bgcolor=#fefefe
| 247515 ||  || — || August 11, 2002 || Palomar || NEAT || — || align=right | 1.6 km || 
|-id=516 bgcolor=#d6d6d6
| 247516 ||  || — || August 16, 2002 || Socorro || LINEAR || EUP || align=right | 7.7 km || 
|-id=517 bgcolor=#FFC2E0
| 247517 ||  || — || August 16, 2002 || Socorro || LINEAR || ATE || align=right data-sort-value="0.27" | 270 m || 
|-id=518 bgcolor=#E9E9E9
| 247518 ||  || — || August 22, 2002 || Palomar || NEAT || — || align=right | 1.9 km || 
|-id=519 bgcolor=#E9E9E9
| 247519 ||  || — || August 27, 2002 || Socorro || LINEAR || — || align=right | 4.0 km || 
|-id=520 bgcolor=#E9E9E9
| 247520 ||  || — || August 28, 2002 || Palomar || NEAT || — || align=right | 1.5 km || 
|-id=521 bgcolor=#d6d6d6
| 247521 ||  || — || August 28, 2002 || Palomar || NEAT || — || align=right | 4.7 km || 
|-id=522 bgcolor=#E9E9E9
| 247522 ||  || — || August 18, 2002 || Palomar || NEAT || — || align=right | 2.7 km || 
|-id=523 bgcolor=#E9E9E9
| 247523 ||  || — || August 19, 2002 || Palomar || NEAT || — || align=right | 2.9 km || 
|-id=524 bgcolor=#E9E9E9
| 247524 ||  || — || August 30, 2002 || Palomar || NEAT || — || align=right | 3.3 km || 
|-id=525 bgcolor=#E9E9E9
| 247525 ||  || — || August 29, 2002 || Palomar || NEAT || — || align=right | 2.9 km || 
|-id=526 bgcolor=#E9E9E9
| 247526 ||  || — || August 17, 2002 || Palomar || NEAT || — || align=right | 3.0 km || 
|-id=527 bgcolor=#d6d6d6
| 247527 ||  || — || August 27, 2002 || Palomar || NEAT || — || align=right | 4.2 km || 
|-id=528 bgcolor=#E9E9E9
| 247528 ||  || — || August 28, 2002 || Palomar || NEAT || — || align=right | 3.9 km || 
|-id=529 bgcolor=#d6d6d6
| 247529 ||  || — || August 16, 2002 || Palomar || NEAT || — || align=right | 3.3 km || 
|-id=530 bgcolor=#E9E9E9
| 247530 ||  || — || August 29, 2002 || Palomar || NEAT || — || align=right | 3.1 km || 
|-id=531 bgcolor=#E9E9E9
| 247531 ||  || — || September 4, 2002 || Palomar || NEAT || — || align=right | 1.9 km || 
|-id=532 bgcolor=#E9E9E9
| 247532 ||  || — || September 4, 2002 || Anderson Mesa || LONEOS || — || align=right | 2.1 km || 
|-id=533 bgcolor=#d6d6d6
| 247533 ||  || — || September 4, 2002 || Anderson Mesa || LONEOS || HYG || align=right | 4.6 km || 
|-id=534 bgcolor=#E9E9E9
| 247534 ||  || — || September 3, 2002 || Needville || Needville Obs. || PAD || align=right | 3.2 km || 
|-id=535 bgcolor=#E9E9E9
| 247535 ||  || — || September 5, 2002 || Anderson Mesa || LONEOS || — || align=right | 1.1 km || 
|-id=536 bgcolor=#E9E9E9
| 247536 ||  || — || September 5, 2002 || Anderson Mesa || LONEOS || — || align=right | 1.3 km || 
|-id=537 bgcolor=#d6d6d6
| 247537 ||  || — || September 5, 2002 || Socorro || LINEAR || — || align=right | 5.7 km || 
|-id=538 bgcolor=#E9E9E9
| 247538 ||  || — || September 5, 2002 || Socorro || LINEAR || — || align=right | 4.9 km || 
|-id=539 bgcolor=#E9E9E9
| 247539 ||  || — || September 4, 2002 || Palomar || NEAT || KON || align=right | 3.0 km || 
|-id=540 bgcolor=#E9E9E9
| 247540 ||  || — || September 5, 2002 || Socorro || LINEAR || — || align=right | 3.2 km || 
|-id=541 bgcolor=#E9E9E9
| 247541 ||  || — || September 6, 2002 || Socorro || LINEAR || — || align=right | 4.1 km || 
|-id=542 bgcolor=#E9E9E9
| 247542 Ripplrónai ||  ||  || September 8, 2002 || Piszkéstető || K. Sárneczky || — || align=right | 1.2 km || 
|-id=543 bgcolor=#E9E9E9
| 247543 ||  || — || September 5, 2002 || Haleakala || NEAT || — || align=right | 2.0 km || 
|-id=544 bgcolor=#E9E9E9
| 247544 ||  || — || September 10, 2002 || Palomar || NEAT || — || align=right | 1.7 km || 
|-id=545 bgcolor=#E9E9E9
| 247545 ||  || — || September 11, 2002 || Palomar || NEAT || — || align=right | 3.2 km || 
|-id=546 bgcolor=#E9E9E9
| 247546 ||  || — || September 13, 2002 || Kitt Peak || Spacewatch || — || align=right | 3.4 km || 
|-id=547 bgcolor=#E9E9E9
| 247547 ||  || — || September 14, 2002 || Haleakala || NEAT || — || align=right | 1.4 km || 
|-id=548 bgcolor=#d6d6d6
| 247548 ||  || — || September 11, 2002 || Palomar || NEAT || — || align=right | 7.2 km || 
|-id=549 bgcolor=#E9E9E9
| 247549 ||  || — || September 13, 2002 || Socorro || LINEAR || — || align=right | 1.3 km || 
|-id=550 bgcolor=#d6d6d6
| 247550 ||  || — || September 14, 2002 || Haleakala || NEAT || — || align=right | 3.6 km || 
|-id=551 bgcolor=#d6d6d6
| 247551 ||  || — || September 15, 2002 || Palomar || NEAT || — || align=right | 5.6 km || 
|-id=552 bgcolor=#fefefe
| 247552 ||  || — || September 13, 2002 || Anderson Mesa || LONEOS || — || align=right | 3.0 km || 
|-id=553 bgcolor=#d6d6d6
| 247553 Berndpauli ||  ||  || September 8, 2002 || Haleakala || R. Matson || HIL3:2 || align=right | 6.9 km || 
|-id=554 bgcolor=#d6d6d6
| 247554 ||  || — || September 14, 2002 || Palomar || R. Matson || HYG || align=right | 3.2 km || 
|-id=555 bgcolor=#E9E9E9
| 247555 ||  || — || September 5, 2002 || Apache Point || SDSS || — || align=right | 2.3 km || 
|-id=556 bgcolor=#E9E9E9
| 247556 ||  || — || September 4, 2002 || Palomar || NEAT || — || align=right | 3.6 km || 
|-id=557 bgcolor=#E9E9E9
| 247557 ||  || — || September 4, 2002 || Palomar || NEAT || HOF || align=right | 3.1 km || 
|-id=558 bgcolor=#d6d6d6
| 247558 ||  || — || September 3, 2002 || Palomar || NEAT || EMA || align=right | 4.9 km || 
|-id=559 bgcolor=#E9E9E9
| 247559 ||  || — || September 27, 2002 || Palomar || NEAT || — || align=right | 3.8 km || 
|-id=560 bgcolor=#d6d6d6
| 247560 ||  || — || September 27, 2002 || Palomar || NEAT || — || align=right | 4.3 km || 
|-id=561 bgcolor=#E9E9E9
| 247561 ||  || — || September 27, 2002 || Palomar || NEAT || ADE || align=right | 3.2 km || 
|-id=562 bgcolor=#d6d6d6
| 247562 ||  || — || September 27, 2002 || Palomar || NEAT || URS || align=right | 5.4 km || 
|-id=563 bgcolor=#d6d6d6
| 247563 ||  || — || September 28, 2002 || Haleakala || NEAT || HIL3:2 || align=right | 7.7 km || 
|-id=564 bgcolor=#E9E9E9
| 247564 ||  || — || September 29, 2002 || Haleakala || NEAT || — || align=right | 1.2 km || 
|-id=565 bgcolor=#E9E9E9
| 247565 ||  || — || September 28, 2002 || Haleakala || NEAT || — || align=right | 1.9 km || 
|-id=566 bgcolor=#E9E9E9
| 247566 ||  || — || September 28, 2002 || Haleakala || NEAT || — || align=right | 2.0 km || 
|-id=567 bgcolor=#d6d6d6
| 247567 ||  || — || September 17, 2002 || Palomar || NEAT || — || align=right | 6.2 km || 
|-id=568 bgcolor=#d6d6d6
| 247568 ||  || — || September 20, 2002 || Palomar || NEAT || LUT || align=right | 6.4 km || 
|-id=569 bgcolor=#fefefe
| 247569 ||  || — || September 28, 2002 || Palomar || NEAT || H || align=right data-sort-value="0.98" | 980 m || 
|-id=570 bgcolor=#E9E9E9
| 247570 ||  || — || September 30, 2002 || Haleakala || NEAT || DOR || align=right | 3.8 km || 
|-id=571 bgcolor=#E9E9E9
| 247571 ||  || — || September 30, 2002 || Haleakala || NEAT || — || align=right | 2.0 km || 
|-id=572 bgcolor=#E9E9E9
| 247572 ||  || — || September 16, 2002 || Palomar || NEAT || HOF || align=right | 2.6 km || 
|-id=573 bgcolor=#E9E9E9
| 247573 ||  || — || October 1, 2002 || Anderson Mesa || LONEOS || — || align=right | 2.5 km || 
|-id=574 bgcolor=#d6d6d6
| 247574 ||  || — || October 2, 2002 || Socorro || LINEAR || — || align=right | 5.6 km || 
|-id=575 bgcolor=#d6d6d6
| 247575 ||  || — || October 2, 2002 || Socorro || LINEAR || — || align=right | 4.8 km || 
|-id=576 bgcolor=#d6d6d6
| 247576 ||  || — || October 2, 2002 || Socorro || LINEAR || — || align=right | 6.3 km || 
|-id=577 bgcolor=#E9E9E9
| 247577 ||  || — || October 2, 2002 || Socorro || LINEAR || — || align=right | 2.0 km || 
|-id=578 bgcolor=#E9E9E9
| 247578 ||  || — || October 2, 2002 || Socorro || LINEAR || — || align=right | 3.4 km || 
|-id=579 bgcolor=#E9E9E9
| 247579 ||  || — || October 2, 2002 || Socorro || LINEAR || — || align=right | 2.3 km || 
|-id=580 bgcolor=#E9E9E9
| 247580 ||  || — || October 2, 2002 || Socorro || LINEAR || EUN || align=right | 1.8 km || 
|-id=581 bgcolor=#E9E9E9
| 247581 ||  || — || October 2, 2002 || Socorro || LINEAR || BRU || align=right | 4.9 km || 
|-id=582 bgcolor=#E9E9E9
| 247582 ||  || — || October 2, 2002 || Socorro || LINEAR || — || align=right | 1.5 km || 
|-id=583 bgcolor=#E9E9E9
| 247583 ||  || — || October 2, 2002 || Socorro || LINEAR || MIT || align=right | 2.7 km || 
|-id=584 bgcolor=#d6d6d6
| 247584 ||  || — || October 1, 2002 || Anderson Mesa || LONEOS || VER || align=right | 6.4 km || 
|-id=585 bgcolor=#E9E9E9
| 247585 ||  || — || October 4, 2002 || Socorro || LINEAR || — || align=right | 4.9 km || 
|-id=586 bgcolor=#E9E9E9
| 247586 ||  || — || October 2, 2002 || Haleakala || NEAT || — || align=right | 1.3 km || 
|-id=587 bgcolor=#E9E9E9
| 247587 ||  || — || October 3, 2002 || Palomar || NEAT || ADE || align=right | 3.2 km || 
|-id=588 bgcolor=#E9E9E9
| 247588 ||  || — || October 2, 2002 || Emerald Lane || L. Ball || — || align=right | 3.7 km || 
|-id=589 bgcolor=#E9E9E9
| 247589 ||  || — || October 4, 2002 || Palomar || NEAT || — || align=right | 1.8 km || 
|-id=590 bgcolor=#E9E9E9
| 247590 ||  || — || October 4, 2002 || Anderson Mesa || LONEOS || — || align=right | 1.3 km || 
|-id=591 bgcolor=#d6d6d6
| 247591 ||  || — || October 5, 2002 || Palomar || NEAT || — || align=right | 7.0 km || 
|-id=592 bgcolor=#E9E9E9
| 247592 ||  || — || October 5, 2002 || Palomar || NEAT || EUN || align=right | 1.5 km || 
|-id=593 bgcolor=#E9E9E9
| 247593 ||  || — || October 3, 2002 || Palomar || NEAT || — || align=right | 3.0 km || 
|-id=594 bgcolor=#E9E9E9
| 247594 ||  || — || October 11, 2002 || Palomar || NEAT || — || align=right | 3.3 km || 
|-id=595 bgcolor=#E9E9E9
| 247595 ||  || — || October 13, 2002 || Palomar || NEAT || EUN || align=right | 1.7 km || 
|-id=596 bgcolor=#E9E9E9
| 247596 ||  || — || October 4, 2002 || Socorro || LINEAR || MAR || align=right | 2.0 km || 
|-id=597 bgcolor=#E9E9E9
| 247597 ||  || — || October 4, 2002 || Socorro || LINEAR || — || align=right | 1.3 km || 
|-id=598 bgcolor=#E9E9E9
| 247598 ||  || — || October 4, 2002 || Socorro || LINEAR || — || align=right | 1.5 km || 
|-id=599 bgcolor=#E9E9E9
| 247599 ||  || — || October 11, 2002 || Powell || Powell Obs. || — || align=right | 2.3 km || 
|-id=600 bgcolor=#d6d6d6
| 247600 ||  || — || October 5, 2002 || Anderson Mesa || LONEOS || — || align=right | 6.7 km || 
|}

247601–247700 

|-bgcolor=#E9E9E9
| 247601 ||  || — || October 7, 2002 || Haleakala || NEAT || — || align=right | 3.6 km || 
|-id=602 bgcolor=#E9E9E9
| 247602 ||  || — || October 8, 2002 || Haleakala || NEAT || — || align=right | 3.5 km || 
|-id=603 bgcolor=#E9E9E9
| 247603 ||  || — || October 6, 2002 || Socorro || LINEAR || EUN || align=right | 1.7 km || 
|-id=604 bgcolor=#E9E9E9
| 247604 ||  || — || October 7, 2002 || Socorro || LINEAR || GER || align=right | 2.7 km || 
|-id=605 bgcolor=#E9E9E9
| 247605 ||  || — || October 9, 2002 || Anderson Mesa || LONEOS || — || align=right | 1.4 km || 
|-id=606 bgcolor=#E9E9E9
| 247606 ||  || — || October 8, 2002 || Anderson Mesa || LONEOS || — || align=right | 2.3 km || 
|-id=607 bgcolor=#E9E9E9
| 247607 ||  || — || October 9, 2002 || Socorro || LINEAR || — || align=right | 1.4 km || 
|-id=608 bgcolor=#E9E9E9
| 247608 ||  || — || October 9, 2002 || Socorro || LINEAR || KON || align=right | 3.3 km || 
|-id=609 bgcolor=#d6d6d6
| 247609 ||  || — || October 10, 2002 || Palomar || NEAT || CHA || align=right | 4.7 km || 
|-id=610 bgcolor=#E9E9E9
| 247610 ||  || — || October 10, 2002 || Socorro || LINEAR || — || align=right | 2.9 km || 
|-id=611 bgcolor=#E9E9E9
| 247611 ||  || — || October 10, 2002 || Socorro || LINEAR || — || align=right | 5.5 km || 
|-id=612 bgcolor=#E9E9E9
| 247612 ||  || — || October 10, 2002 || Socorro || LINEAR || — || align=right | 2.8 km || 
|-id=613 bgcolor=#E9E9E9
| 247613 ||  || — || October 10, 2002 || Socorro || LINEAR || ADE || align=right | 3.5 km || 
|-id=614 bgcolor=#E9E9E9
| 247614 ||  || — || October 10, 2002 || Socorro || LINEAR || — || align=right | 2.4 km || 
|-id=615 bgcolor=#E9E9E9
| 247615 ||  || — || October 10, 2002 || Socorro || LINEAR || — || align=right | 2.6 km || 
|-id=616 bgcolor=#fefefe
| 247616 ||  || — || October 15, 2002 || Socorro || LINEAR || H || align=right data-sort-value="0.97" | 970 m || 
|-id=617 bgcolor=#d6d6d6
| 247617 ||  || — || October 5, 2002 || Palomar || K. Černis || EUP || align=right | 5.0 km || 
|-id=618 bgcolor=#d6d6d6
| 247618 ||  || — || October 4, 2002 || Apache Point || SDSS || — || align=right | 4.6 km || 
|-id=619 bgcolor=#E9E9E9
| 247619 ||  || — || October 4, 2002 || Apache Point || SDSS || — || align=right | 3.2 km || 
|-id=620 bgcolor=#d6d6d6
| 247620 ||  || — || October 5, 2002 || Apache Point || SDSS || — || align=right | 4.0 km || 
|-id=621 bgcolor=#d6d6d6
| 247621 ||  || — || October 5, 2002 || Apache Point || SDSS || — || align=right | 3.5 km || 
|-id=622 bgcolor=#E9E9E9
| 247622 ||  || — || October 10, 2002 || Apache Point || SDSS || — || align=right | 1.7 km || 
|-id=623 bgcolor=#E9E9E9
| 247623 ||  || — || October 5, 2002 || Palomar || NEAT || — || align=right | 2.2 km || 
|-id=624 bgcolor=#E9E9E9
| 247624 ||  || — || October 15, 2002 || Palomar || NEAT || — || align=right | 1.7 km || 
|-id=625 bgcolor=#d6d6d6
| 247625 ||  || — || October 28, 2002 || Socorro || LINEAR || EUP || align=right | 7.0 km || 
|-id=626 bgcolor=#d6d6d6
| 247626 ||  || — || October 28, 2002 || Socorro || LINEAR || EUP || align=right | 5.2 km || 
|-id=627 bgcolor=#E9E9E9
| 247627 ||  || — || October 31, 2002 || Palomar || NEAT || — || align=right | 2.8 km || 
|-id=628 bgcolor=#E9E9E9
| 247628 ||  || — || October 29, 2002 || Kitt Peak || Spacewatch || — || align=right | 4.0 km || 
|-id=629 bgcolor=#E9E9E9
| 247629 ||  || — || October 30, 2002 || Haleakala || NEAT || — || align=right | 3.1 km || 
|-id=630 bgcolor=#E9E9E9
| 247630 ||  || — || October 30, 2002 || Palomar || NEAT || — || align=right | 3.3 km || 
|-id=631 bgcolor=#E9E9E9
| 247631 ||  || — || October 31, 2002 || Socorro || LINEAR || — || align=right | 1.9 km || 
|-id=632 bgcolor=#d6d6d6
| 247632 ||  || — || October 30, 2002 || Palomar || NEAT || — || align=right | 5.9 km || 
|-id=633 bgcolor=#d6d6d6
| 247633 ||  || — || November 4, 2002 || Kitt Peak || Spacewatch || URS || align=right | 5.5 km || 
|-id=634 bgcolor=#E9E9E9
| 247634 ||  || — || November 4, 2002 || Anderson Mesa || LONEOS || — || align=right | 2.5 km || 
|-id=635 bgcolor=#E9E9E9
| 247635 ||  || — || November 5, 2002 || Socorro || LINEAR || — || align=right | 1.5 km || 
|-id=636 bgcolor=#d6d6d6
| 247636 ||  || — || November 5, 2002 || Socorro || LINEAR || THB || align=right | 7.3 km || 
|-id=637 bgcolor=#E9E9E9
| 247637 ||  || — || November 1, 2002 || Palomar || NEAT || — || align=right | 4.2 km || 
|-id=638 bgcolor=#E9E9E9
| 247638 ||  || — || November 4, 2002 || Haleakala || NEAT || — || align=right | 2.0 km || 
|-id=639 bgcolor=#E9E9E9
| 247639 ||  || — || November 6, 2002 || Socorro || LINEAR || — || align=right | 1.4 km || 
|-id=640 bgcolor=#E9E9E9
| 247640 ||  || — || November 7, 2002 || Socorro || LINEAR || — || align=right | 2.3 km || 
|-id=641 bgcolor=#d6d6d6
| 247641 ||  || — || November 7, 2002 || Socorro || LINEAR || ALA || align=right | 5.6 km || 
|-id=642 bgcolor=#d6d6d6
| 247642 ||  || — || November 11, 2002 || Socorro || LINEAR || EUP || align=right | 4.9 km || 
|-id=643 bgcolor=#d6d6d6
| 247643 ||  || — || November 13, 2002 || Palomar || NEAT || LIX || align=right | 6.4 km || 
|-id=644 bgcolor=#E9E9E9
| 247644 ||  || — || November 12, 2002 || Socorro || LINEAR || — || align=right | 2.1 km || 
|-id=645 bgcolor=#d6d6d6
| 247645 ||  || — || November 13, 2002 || Palomar || NEAT || — || align=right | 5.2 km || 
|-id=646 bgcolor=#E9E9E9
| 247646 ||  || — || November 13, 2002 || Kingsnake || J. V. McClusky || — || align=right | 1.9 km || 
|-id=647 bgcolor=#E9E9E9
| 247647 ||  || — || November 1, 2002 || Socorro || LINEAR || — || align=right | 1.8 km || 
|-id=648 bgcolor=#E9E9E9
| 247648 ||  || — || November 7, 2002 || Socorro || LINEAR || — || align=right | 2.0 km || 
|-id=649 bgcolor=#E9E9E9
| 247649 ||  || — || November 24, 2002 || Palomar || NEAT || — || align=right | 2.0 km || 
|-id=650 bgcolor=#E9E9E9
| 247650 ||  || — || November 24, 2002 || Palomar || NEAT || — || align=right | 2.7 km || 
|-id=651 bgcolor=#E9E9E9
| 247651 ||  || — || November 28, 2002 || Anderson Mesa || LONEOS || slow || align=right | 5.3 km || 
|-id=652 bgcolor=#E9E9E9
| 247652 Hajossy ||  ||  || November 26, 2002 || Palomar || NEAT || — || align=right | 2.0 km || 
|-id=653 bgcolor=#C2FFFF
| 247653 ||  || — || November 24, 2002 || Palomar || NEAT || L5 || align=right | 11 km || 
|-id=654 bgcolor=#E9E9E9
| 247654 ||  || — || December 3, 2002 || Palomar || NEAT || — || align=right | 2.6 km || 
|-id=655 bgcolor=#d6d6d6
| 247655 ||  || — || December 2, 2002 || Socorro || LINEAR || — || align=right | 7.0 km || 
|-id=656 bgcolor=#E9E9E9
| 247656 ||  || — || December 5, 2002 || Anderson Mesa || LONEOS || — || align=right | 2.6 km || 
|-id=657 bgcolor=#E9E9E9
| 247657 ||  || — || December 10, 2002 || Socorro || LINEAR || — || align=right | 2.9 km || 
|-id=658 bgcolor=#E9E9E9
| 247658 ||  || — || December 11, 2002 || Socorro || LINEAR || — || align=right | 1.4 km || 
|-id=659 bgcolor=#E9E9E9
| 247659 ||  || — || December 11, 2002 || Socorro || LINEAR || GEF || align=right | 2.0 km || 
|-id=660 bgcolor=#d6d6d6
| 247660 ||  || — || December 11, 2002 || Desert Eagle || W. K. Y. Yeung || URS || align=right | 3.3 km || 
|-id=661 bgcolor=#E9E9E9
| 247661 ||  || — || December 13, 2002 || Socorro || LINEAR || — || align=right | 5.1 km || 
|-id=662 bgcolor=#E9E9E9
| 247662 ||  || — || December 11, 2002 || Socorro || LINEAR || EUN || align=right | 3.4 km || 
|-id=663 bgcolor=#E9E9E9
| 247663 ||  || — || December 13, 2002 || Socorro || LINEAR || — || align=right | 1.4 km || 
|-id=664 bgcolor=#E9E9E9
| 247664 ||  || — || December 13, 2002 || Palomar || NEAT || — || align=right | 3.3 km || 
|-id=665 bgcolor=#FA8072
| 247665 ||  || — || December 14, 2002 || Socorro || LINEAR || — || align=right | 1.4 km || 
|-id=666 bgcolor=#E9E9E9
| 247666 ||  || — || December 5, 2002 || Kitt Peak || M. W. Buie || — || align=right | 1.9 km || 
|-id=667 bgcolor=#d6d6d6
| 247667 ||  || — || December 5, 2002 || Socorro || LINEAR || — || align=right | 4.7 km || 
|-id=668 bgcolor=#d6d6d6
| 247668 ||  || — || December 5, 2002 || Socorro || LINEAR || — || align=right | 4.9 km || 
|-id=669 bgcolor=#d6d6d6
| 247669 ||  || — || December 6, 2002 || Socorro || LINEAR || — || align=right | 5.1 km || 
|-id=670 bgcolor=#d6d6d6
| 247670 ||  || — || December 3, 2002 || Palomar || NEAT || EUP || align=right | 4.3 km || 
|-id=671 bgcolor=#E9E9E9
| 247671 ||  || — || December 31, 2002 || Socorro || LINEAR || — || align=right | 2.0 km || 
|-id=672 bgcolor=#E9E9E9
| 247672 ||  || — || December 31, 2002 || Kitt Peak || Spacewatch || — || align=right | 5.2 km || 
|-id=673 bgcolor=#d6d6d6
| 247673 ||  || — || December 31, 2002 || Kitt Peak || Spacewatch || — || align=right | 6.1 km || 
|-id=674 bgcolor=#E9E9E9
| 247674 ||  || — || December 31, 2002 || Socorro || LINEAR || — || align=right | 3.0 km || 
|-id=675 bgcolor=#fefefe
| 247675 ||  || — || December 31, 2002 || Socorro || LINEAR || FLO || align=right | 2.3 km || 
|-id=676 bgcolor=#d6d6d6
| 247676 ||  || — || December 31, 2002 || Socorro || LINEAR || EUP || align=right | 6.5 km || 
|-id=677 bgcolor=#d6d6d6
| 247677 ||  || — || December 31, 2002 || Kitt Peak || Spacewatch || — || align=right | 6.4 km || 
|-id=678 bgcolor=#E9E9E9
| 247678 ||  || — || January 2, 2003 || Socorro || LINEAR || — || align=right | 2.7 km || 
|-id=679 bgcolor=#d6d6d6
| 247679 ||  || — || January 1, 2003 || Kingsnake || J. V. McClusky || EUP || align=right | 6.8 km || 
|-id=680 bgcolor=#E9E9E9
| 247680 ||  || — || January 1, 2003 || Socorro || LINEAR || — || align=right | 3.4 km || 
|-id=681 bgcolor=#E9E9E9
| 247681 ||  || — || January 1, 2003 || Socorro || LINEAR || EUN || align=right | 2.1 km || 
|-id=682 bgcolor=#E9E9E9
| 247682 ||  || — || January 7, 2003 || Socorro || LINEAR || — || align=right | 4.7 km || 
|-id=683 bgcolor=#fefefe
| 247683 ||  || — || January 5, 2003 || Socorro || LINEAR || FLO || align=right | 1.4 km || 
|-id=684 bgcolor=#d6d6d6
| 247684 ||  || — || January 7, 2003 || Socorro || LINEAR || LIX || align=right | 6.0 km || 
|-id=685 bgcolor=#E9E9E9
| 247685 ||  || — || January 7, 2003 || Socorro || LINEAR || — || align=right | 3.3 km || 
|-id=686 bgcolor=#E9E9E9
| 247686 ||  || — || January 10, 2003 || Socorro || LINEAR || — || align=right | 3.9 km || 
|-id=687 bgcolor=#E9E9E9
| 247687 ||  || — || January 10, 2003 || Socorro || LINEAR || BRU || align=right | 4.7 km || 
|-id=688 bgcolor=#fefefe
| 247688 ||  || — || January 26, 2003 || Kitt Peak || Spacewatch || — || align=right | 1.3 km || 
|-id=689 bgcolor=#d6d6d6
| 247689 ||  || — || January 27, 2003 || Anderson Mesa || LONEOS || — || align=right | 6.0 km || 
|-id=690 bgcolor=#E9E9E9
| 247690 ||  || — || January 25, 2003 || Palomar || NEAT || JUN || align=right | 1.6 km || 
|-id=691 bgcolor=#d6d6d6
| 247691 ||  || — || January 26, 2003 || Anderson Mesa || LONEOS || — || align=right | 6.2 km || 
|-id=692 bgcolor=#E9E9E9
| 247692 ||  || — || January 27, 2003 || Socorro || LINEAR || — || align=right | 2.1 km || 
|-id=693 bgcolor=#E9E9E9
| 247693 ||  || — || January 27, 2003 || Socorro || LINEAR || — || align=right | 2.5 km || 
|-id=694 bgcolor=#E9E9E9
| 247694 ||  || — || January 26, 2003 || Kitt Peak || Spacewatch || — || align=right | 3.7 km || 
|-id=695 bgcolor=#d6d6d6
| 247695 ||  || — || January 28, 2003 || Kitt Peak || Spacewatch || — || align=right | 4.5 km || 
|-id=696 bgcolor=#d6d6d6
| 247696 ||  || — || January 27, 2003 || Socorro || LINEAR || — || align=right | 6.9 km || 
|-id=697 bgcolor=#E9E9E9
| 247697 ||  || — || January 27, 2003 || Socorro || LINEAR || — || align=right | 4.3 km || 
|-id=698 bgcolor=#fefefe
| 247698 ||  || — || January 27, 2003 || Socorro || LINEAR || — || align=right | 2.7 km || 
|-id=699 bgcolor=#E9E9E9
| 247699 ||  || — || January 29, 2003 || Palomar || NEAT || — || align=right | 2.5 km || 
|-id=700 bgcolor=#fefefe
| 247700 ||  || — || January 23, 2003 || Kitt Peak || Spacewatch || NYS || align=right | 1.6 km || 
|}

247701–247800 

|-bgcolor=#d6d6d6
| 247701 ||  || — || February 1, 2003 || Socorro || LINEAR || EUP || align=right | 5.3 km || 
|-id=702 bgcolor=#E9E9E9
| 247702 ||  || — || February 1, 2003 || Socorro || LINEAR || — || align=right | 5.1 km || 
|-id=703 bgcolor=#d6d6d6
| 247703 ||  || — || February 1, 2003 || Socorro || LINEAR || — || align=right | 6.3 km || 
|-id=704 bgcolor=#E9E9E9
| 247704 ||  || — || February 2, 2003 || Socorro || LINEAR || — || align=right | 2.7 km || 
|-id=705 bgcolor=#E9E9E9
| 247705 ||  || — || February 4, 2003 || La Silla || C. Barbieri || HOF || align=right | 3.4 km || 
|-id=706 bgcolor=#E9E9E9
| 247706 ||  || — || February 21, 2003 || Palomar || NEAT || — || align=right | 3.6 km || 
|-id=707 bgcolor=#d6d6d6
| 247707 ||  || — || February 23, 2003 || Campo Imperatore || CINEOS || — || align=right | 5.0 km || 
|-id=708 bgcolor=#d6d6d6
| 247708 ||  || — || February 25, 2003 || Campo Imperatore || CINEOS || — || align=right | 4.8 km || 
|-id=709 bgcolor=#d6d6d6
| 247709 ||  || — || March 4, 2003 || Saint-Véran || Saint-Véran Obs. || — || align=right | 5.0 km || 
|-id=710 bgcolor=#d6d6d6
| 247710 ||  || — || March 6, 2003 || Socorro || LINEAR || ALA || align=right | 6.3 km || 
|-id=711 bgcolor=#fefefe
| 247711 ||  || — || March 7, 2003 || Socorro || LINEAR || ERI || align=right | 2.1 km || 
|-id=712 bgcolor=#d6d6d6
| 247712 ||  || — || March 8, 2003 || Socorro || LINEAR || Tj (2.95) || align=right | 7.0 km || 
|-id=713 bgcolor=#d6d6d6
| 247713 ||  || — || March 9, 2003 || Palomar || NEAT || — || align=right | 3.7 km || 
|-id=714 bgcolor=#E9E9E9
| 247714 ||  || — || March 9, 2003 || Socorro || LINEAR || — || align=right | 5.9 km || 
|-id=715 bgcolor=#E9E9E9
| 247715 ||  || — || March 24, 2003 || Črni Vrh || H. Mikuž || — || align=right | 4.1 km || 
|-id=716 bgcolor=#E9E9E9
| 247716 ||  || — || March 24, 2003 || Kitt Peak || Spacewatch || — || align=right | 3.4 km || 
|-id=717 bgcolor=#d6d6d6
| 247717 ||  || — || March 23, 2003 || Palomar || NEAT || — || align=right | 5.3 km || 
|-id=718 bgcolor=#d6d6d6
| 247718 ||  || — || March 26, 2003 || Socorro || LINEAR || EUP || align=right | 6.8 km || 
|-id=719 bgcolor=#E9E9E9
| 247719 ||  || — || March 23, 2003 || Kitt Peak || Spacewatch || HNS || align=right | 2.5 km || 
|-id=720 bgcolor=#d6d6d6
| 247720 ||  || — || March 26, 2003 || Palomar || NEAT || TIR || align=right | 4.8 km || 
|-id=721 bgcolor=#fefefe
| 247721 ||  || — || March 28, 2003 || Campo Imperatore || CINEOS || — || align=right | 2.3 km || 
|-id=722 bgcolor=#d6d6d6
| 247722 ||  || — || March 29, 2003 || Anderson Mesa || LONEOS || — || align=right | 4.5 km || 
|-id=723 bgcolor=#d6d6d6
| 247723 ||  || — || March 29, 2003 || Anderson Mesa || LONEOS || — || align=right | 6.2 km || 
|-id=724 bgcolor=#d6d6d6
| 247724 ||  || — || March 30, 2003 || Kitt Peak || Spacewatch || — || align=right | 5.0 km || 
|-id=725 bgcolor=#E9E9E9
| 247725 ||  || — || March 26, 2003 || Kitt Peak || Spacewatch || DOR || align=right | 4.4 km || 
|-id=726 bgcolor=#d6d6d6
| 247726 ||  || — || March 26, 2003 || Kitt Peak || Spacewatch || — || align=right | 5.0 km || 
|-id=727 bgcolor=#d6d6d6
| 247727 ||  || — || April 4, 2003 || Uccle || Uccle Obs. || — || align=right | 5.6 km || 
|-id=728 bgcolor=#fefefe
| 247728 ||  || — || April 6, 2003 || Kitt Peak || Spacewatch || ERI || align=right | 2.3 km || 
|-id=729 bgcolor=#fefefe
| 247729 ||  || — || April 7, 2003 || Kitt Peak || Spacewatch || — || align=right data-sort-value="0.85" | 850 m || 
|-id=730 bgcolor=#d6d6d6
| 247730 ||  || — || April 7, 2003 || Bergisch Gladbach || W. Bickel || — || align=right | 5.6 km || 
|-id=731 bgcolor=#fefefe
| 247731 ||  || — || April 25, 2003 || Kitt Peak || Spacewatch || NYS || align=right | 1.7 km || 
|-id=732 bgcolor=#d6d6d6
| 247732 ||  || — || April 25, 2003 || Kitt Peak || Spacewatch || — || align=right | 5.8 km || 
|-id=733 bgcolor=#fefefe
| 247733 ||  || — || April 26, 2003 || Haleakala || NEAT || — || align=right | 1.1 km || 
|-id=734 bgcolor=#d6d6d6
| 247734 ||  || — || April 27, 2003 || Anderson Mesa || LONEOS || — || align=right | 5.1 km || 
|-id=735 bgcolor=#fefefe
| 247735 ||  || — || April 28, 2003 || Anderson Mesa || LONEOS || — || align=right | 2.4 km || 
|-id=736 bgcolor=#d6d6d6
| 247736 ||  || — || April 30, 2003 || Socorro || LINEAR || — || align=right | 4.7 km || 
|-id=737 bgcolor=#d6d6d6
| 247737 ||  || — || May 1, 2003 || Socorro || LINEAR || — || align=right | 4.1 km || 
|-id=738 bgcolor=#d6d6d6
| 247738 ||  || — || May 22, 2003 || Kitt Peak || Spacewatch || EOS || align=right | 3.5 km || 
|-id=739 bgcolor=#fefefe
| 247739 ||  || — || May 29, 2003 || Socorro || LINEAR || — || align=right | 1.4 km || 
|-id=740 bgcolor=#FA8072
| 247740 ||  || — || June 5, 2003 || Reedy Creek || J. Broughton || — || align=right | 1.8 km || 
|-id=741 bgcolor=#fefefe
| 247741 ||  || — || June 5, 2003 || Kitt Peak || Spacewatch || — || align=right | 1.1 km || 
|-id=742 bgcolor=#E9E9E9
| 247742 ||  || — || June 8, 2003 || Siding Spring || R. H. McNaught || — || align=right | 3.6 km || 
|-id=743 bgcolor=#FA8072
| 247743 ||  || — || June 28, 2003 || Socorro || LINEAR || — || align=right | 1.9 km || 
|-id=744 bgcolor=#E9E9E9
| 247744 ||  || — || June 28, 2003 || Socorro || LINEAR || — || align=right | 4.8 km || 
|-id=745 bgcolor=#FA8072
| 247745 ||  || — || July 4, 2003 || Anderson Mesa || LONEOS || PHO || align=right | 1.3 km || 
|-id=746 bgcolor=#E9E9E9
| 247746 ||  || — || July 3, 2003 || Kitt Peak || Spacewatch || — || align=right | 3.2 km || 
|-id=747 bgcolor=#E9E9E9
| 247747 ||  || — || July 27, 2003 || Reedy Creek || J. Broughton || — || align=right | 2.9 km || 
|-id=748 bgcolor=#FA8072
| 247748 ||  || — || July 27, 2003 || Socorro || LINEAR || — || align=right | 2.0 km || 
|-id=749 bgcolor=#E9E9E9
| 247749 ||  || — || July 28, 2003 || Haleakala || NEAT || — || align=right | 2.7 km || 
|-id=750 bgcolor=#d6d6d6
| 247750 ||  || — || July 29, 2003 || Socorro || LINEAR || Tj (2.99) || align=right | 6.4 km || 
|-id=751 bgcolor=#fefefe
| 247751 ||  || — || July 24, 2003 || Palomar || NEAT || FLO || align=right data-sort-value="0.87" | 870 m || 
|-id=752 bgcolor=#fefefe
| 247752 ||  || — || July 30, 2003 || Socorro || LINEAR || — || align=right | 1.2 km || 
|-id=753 bgcolor=#fefefe
| 247753 ||  || — || August 1, 2003 || Reedy Creek || J. Broughton || — || align=right | 1.2 km || 
|-id=754 bgcolor=#fefefe
| 247754 ||  || — || August 1, 2003 || Socorro || LINEAR || — || align=right | 3.8 km || 
|-id=755 bgcolor=#E9E9E9
| 247755 ||  || — || August 1, 2003 || Socorro || LINEAR || BRU || align=right | 4.8 km || 
|-id=756 bgcolor=#fefefe
| 247756 ||  || — || August 4, 2003 || Socorro || LINEAR || ERI || align=right | 1.3 km || 
|-id=757 bgcolor=#fefefe
| 247757 ||  || — || August 3, 2003 || Črni Vrh || Črni Vrh || FLO || align=right | 1.1 km || 
|-id=758 bgcolor=#fefefe
| 247758 ||  || — || August 18, 2003 || Campo Imperatore || CINEOS || — || align=right | 1.2 km || 
|-id=759 bgcolor=#fefefe
| 247759 ||  || — || August 21, 2003 || Campo Imperatore || CINEOS || — || align=right | 2.6 km || 
|-id=760 bgcolor=#FA8072
| 247760 ||  || — || August 21, 2003 || Socorro || LINEAR || PHO || align=right | 1.5 km || 
|-id=761 bgcolor=#E9E9E9
| 247761 ||  || — || August 20, 2003 || Črni Vrh || Črni Vrh || ADE || align=right | 4.1 km || 
|-id=762 bgcolor=#d6d6d6
| 247762 ||  || — || August 20, 2003 || Palomar || NEAT || — || align=right | 6.1 km || 
|-id=763 bgcolor=#d6d6d6
| 247763 ||  || — || August 22, 2003 || Palomar || NEAT || 7:4 || align=right | 7.5 km || 
|-id=764 bgcolor=#fefefe
| 247764 ||  || — || August 22, 2003 || Haleakala || NEAT || — || align=right data-sort-value="0.98" | 980 m || 
|-id=765 bgcolor=#fefefe
| 247765 ||  || — || August 22, 2003 || Socorro || LINEAR || V || align=right | 1.1 km || 
|-id=766 bgcolor=#fefefe
| 247766 ||  || — || August 23, 2003 || Socorro || LINEAR || — || align=right | 1.1 km || 
|-id=767 bgcolor=#E9E9E9
| 247767 ||  || — || August 23, 2003 || Socorro || LINEAR || — || align=right | 3.7 km || 
|-id=768 bgcolor=#fefefe
| 247768 ||  || — || August 23, 2003 || Socorro || LINEAR || NYS || align=right data-sort-value="0.86" | 860 m || 
|-id=769 bgcolor=#fefefe
| 247769 ||  || — || August 22, 2003 || Palomar || NEAT || — || align=right | 2.1 km || 
|-id=770 bgcolor=#fefefe
| 247770 ||  || — || August 24, 2003 || Socorro || LINEAR || FLO || align=right data-sort-value="0.97" | 970 m || 
|-id=771 bgcolor=#fefefe
| 247771 ||  || — || August 25, 2003 || Socorro || LINEAR || V || align=right | 1.1 km || 
|-id=772 bgcolor=#fefefe
| 247772 ||  || — || August 28, 2003 || Socorro || LINEAR || FLO || align=right | 1.2 km || 
|-id=773 bgcolor=#fefefe
| 247773 ||  || — || August 28, 2003 || Palomar || NEAT || — || align=right | 1.1 km || 
|-id=774 bgcolor=#E9E9E9
| 247774 ||  || — || August 30, 2003 || Kitt Peak || Spacewatch || — || align=right | 2.9 km || 
|-id=775 bgcolor=#fefefe
| 247775 ||  || — || August 30, 2003 || Kitt Peak || Spacewatch || PHO || align=right | 1.7 km || 
|-id=776 bgcolor=#E9E9E9
| 247776 ||  || — || August 31, 2003 || Socorro || LINEAR || — || align=right | 2.8 km || 
|-id=777 bgcolor=#fefefe
| 247777 ||  || — || August 31, 2003 || Socorro || LINEAR || — || align=right | 2.1 km || 
|-id=778 bgcolor=#fefefe
| 247778 ||  || — || September 1, 2003 || Socorro || LINEAR || PHO || align=right | 2.4 km || 
|-id=779 bgcolor=#FA8072
| 247779 ||  || — || September 2, 2003 || Haleakala || NEAT || PHO || align=right | 1.1 km || 
|-id=780 bgcolor=#fefefe
| 247780 ||  || — || September 1, 2003 || Socorro || LINEAR || — || align=right | 1.5 km || 
|-id=781 bgcolor=#fefefe
| 247781 ||  || — || September 3, 2003 || Socorro || LINEAR || V || align=right | 1.0 km || 
|-id=782 bgcolor=#fefefe
| 247782 ||  || — || September 3, 2003 || Socorro || LINEAR || V || align=right data-sort-value="0.87" | 870 m || 
|-id=783 bgcolor=#fefefe
| 247783 ||  || — || September 13, 2003 || Haleakala || NEAT || FLO || align=right | 1.4 km || 
|-id=784 bgcolor=#d6d6d6
| 247784 ||  || — || September 15, 2003 || Haleakala || NEAT || EUP || align=right | 6.8 km || 
|-id=785 bgcolor=#E9E9E9
| 247785 ||  || — || September 15, 2003 || Palomar || NEAT || — || align=right | 4.6 km || 
|-id=786 bgcolor=#E9E9E9
| 247786 ||  || — || September 16, 2003 || Kitt Peak || Spacewatch || — || align=right | 2.5 km || 
|-id=787 bgcolor=#fefefe
| 247787 ||  || — || September 16, 2003 || Kitt Peak || Spacewatch || FLO || align=right | 2.6 km || 
|-id=788 bgcolor=#E9E9E9
| 247788 ||  || — || September 18, 2003 || Palomar || NEAT || — || align=right | 3.7 km || 
|-id=789 bgcolor=#fefefe
| 247789 ||  || — || September 16, 2003 || Palomar || NEAT || — || align=right | 1.4 km || 
|-id=790 bgcolor=#E9E9E9
| 247790 ||  || — || September 16, 2003 || Palomar || NEAT || KON || align=right | 4.2 km || 
|-id=791 bgcolor=#fefefe
| 247791 ||  || — || September 16, 2003 || Palomar || NEAT || NYS || align=right data-sort-value="0.79" | 790 m || 
|-id=792 bgcolor=#fefefe
| 247792 ||  || — || September 16, 2003 || Palomar || NEAT || FLO || align=right | 1.1 km || 
|-id=793 bgcolor=#fefefe
| 247793 ||  || — || September 16, 2003 || Anderson Mesa || LONEOS || V || align=right | 1.0 km || 
|-id=794 bgcolor=#fefefe
| 247794 ||  || — || September 16, 2003 || Anderson Mesa || LONEOS || — || align=right | 1.1 km || 
|-id=795 bgcolor=#fefefe
| 247795 ||  || — || September 16, 2003 || Anderson Mesa || LONEOS || FLO || align=right | 1.6 km || 
|-id=796 bgcolor=#fefefe
| 247796 ||  || — || September 17, 2003 || Anderson Mesa || LONEOS || CIM || align=right | 2.5 km || 
|-id=797 bgcolor=#fefefe
| 247797 ||  || — || September 17, 2003 || Kitt Peak || Spacewatch || NYS || align=right | 2.4 km || 
|-id=798 bgcolor=#fefefe
| 247798 ||  || — || September 17, 2003 || Kitt Peak || Spacewatch || CHL || align=right | 2.1 km || 
|-id=799 bgcolor=#E9E9E9
| 247799 ||  || — || September 17, 2003 || Kitt Peak || Spacewatch || PAE || align=right | 4.3 km || 
|-id=800 bgcolor=#E9E9E9
| 247800 ||  || — || September 18, 2003 || Kitt Peak || Spacewatch || HOF || align=right | 3.6 km || 
|}

247801–247900 

|-bgcolor=#d6d6d6
| 247801 ||  || — || September 18, 2003 || Kitt Peak || Spacewatch || TRP || align=right | 3.9 km || 
|-id=802 bgcolor=#E9E9E9
| 247802 ||  || — || September 18, 2003 || Kitt Peak || Spacewatch || — || align=right | 4.2 km || 
|-id=803 bgcolor=#fefefe
| 247803 ||  || — || September 18, 2003 || Socorro || LINEAR || FLO || align=right data-sort-value="0.66" | 660 m || 
|-id=804 bgcolor=#fefefe
| 247804 ||  || — || September 18, 2003 || Socorro || LINEAR || — || align=right | 1.2 km || 
|-id=805 bgcolor=#fefefe
| 247805 ||  || — || September 19, 2003 || Socorro || LINEAR || — || align=right | 1.7 km || 
|-id=806 bgcolor=#fefefe
| 247806 ||  || — || September 20, 2003 || Palomar || NEAT || — || align=right | 1.9 km || 
|-id=807 bgcolor=#fefefe
| 247807 ||  || — || September 20, 2003 || Palomar || NEAT || FLO || align=right | 1.00 km || 
|-id=808 bgcolor=#fefefe
| 247808 ||  || — || September 20, 2003 || Palomar || NEAT || FLO || align=right | 1.5 km || 
|-id=809 bgcolor=#fefefe
| 247809 ||  || — || September 19, 2003 || Haleakala || NEAT || — || align=right | 3.3 km || 
|-id=810 bgcolor=#fefefe
| 247810 ||  || — || September 16, 2003 || Kitt Peak || Spacewatch || — || align=right | 3.1 km || 
|-id=811 bgcolor=#fefefe
| 247811 ||  || — || September 17, 2003 || Campo Imperatore || CINEOS || V || align=right data-sort-value="0.71" | 710 m || 
|-id=812 bgcolor=#fefefe
| 247812 ||  || — || September 18, 2003 || Goodricke-Pigott || R. A. Tucker || — || align=right | 1.3 km || 
|-id=813 bgcolor=#fefefe
| 247813 ||  || — || September 21, 2003 || Socorro || LINEAR || — || align=right | 2.2 km || 
|-id=814 bgcolor=#d6d6d6
| 247814 ||  || — || September 19, 2003 || Haleakala || NEAT || TIR || align=right | 2.5 km || 
|-id=815 bgcolor=#fefefe
| 247815 ||  || — || September 20, 2003 || Socorro || LINEAR || FLO || align=right | 1.6 km || 
|-id=816 bgcolor=#fefefe
| 247816 ||  || — || September 19, 2003 || Palomar || NEAT || — || align=right | 2.0 km || 
|-id=817 bgcolor=#d6d6d6
| 247817 ||  || — || September 20, 2003 || Palomar || NEAT || — || align=right | 5.0 km || 
|-id=818 bgcolor=#fefefe
| 247818 ||  || — || September 17, 2003 || Socorro || LINEAR || V || align=right | 3.0 km || 
|-id=819 bgcolor=#fefefe
| 247819 ||  || — || September 19, 2003 || Anderson Mesa || LONEOS || V || align=right | 1.2 km || 
|-id=820 bgcolor=#d6d6d6
| 247820 ||  || — || September 19, 2003 || Anderson Mesa || LONEOS || CHA || align=right | 3.9 km || 
|-id=821 bgcolor=#d6d6d6
| 247821 Coignet ||  ||  || September 22, 2003 || Uccle || T. Pauwels || — || align=right | 5.7 km || 
|-id=822 bgcolor=#FA8072
| 247822 ||  || — || September 19, 2003 || Haleakala || NEAT || — || align=right data-sort-value="0.91" | 910 m || 
|-id=823 bgcolor=#d6d6d6
| 247823 ||  || — || September 21, 2003 || Haleakala || NEAT || SYL7:4 || align=right | 7.1 km || 
|-id=824 bgcolor=#E9E9E9
| 247824 ||  || — || September 22, 2003 || Anderson Mesa || LONEOS || — || align=right | 4.2 km || 
|-id=825 bgcolor=#fefefe
| 247825 ||  || — || September 24, 2003 || Palomar || NEAT || — || align=right | 1.3 km || 
|-id=826 bgcolor=#d6d6d6
| 247826 ||  || — || September 20, 2003 || Palomar || NEAT || — || align=right | 4.6 km || 
|-id=827 bgcolor=#FA8072
| 247827 ||  || — || September 21, 2003 || Anderson Mesa || LONEOS || fast? || align=right | 1.5 km || 
|-id=828 bgcolor=#fefefe
| 247828 ||  || — || September 23, 2003 || Palomar || NEAT || V || align=right data-sort-value="0.71" | 710 m || 
|-id=829 bgcolor=#fefefe
| 247829 ||  || — || September 27, 2003 || Desert Eagle || W. K. Y. Yeung || ERI || align=right | 3.3 km || 
|-id=830 bgcolor=#E9E9E9
| 247830 ||  || — || September 27, 2003 || Kitt Peak || Spacewatch || HOF || align=right | 3.4 km || 
|-id=831 bgcolor=#fefefe
| 247831 ||  || — || September 24, 2003 || Haleakala || NEAT || NYS || align=right | 1.9 km || 
|-id=832 bgcolor=#E9E9E9
| 247832 ||  || — || September 26, 2003 || Socorro || LINEAR || — || align=right | 3.6 km || 
|-id=833 bgcolor=#fefefe
| 247833 ||  || — || September 26, 2003 || Socorro || LINEAR || — || align=right | 4.2 km || 
|-id=834 bgcolor=#E9E9E9
| 247834 ||  || — || September 27, 2003 || Kitt Peak || Spacewatch || KON || align=right | 4.5 km || 
|-id=835 bgcolor=#fefefe
| 247835 ||  || — || September 27, 2003 || Kitt Peak || Spacewatch || — || align=right | 1.1 km || 
|-id=836 bgcolor=#fefefe
| 247836 ||  || — || September 28, 2003 || Socorro || LINEAR || — || align=right | 2.3 km || 
|-id=837 bgcolor=#fefefe
| 247837 ||  || — || September 29, 2003 || Socorro || LINEAR || — || align=right | 1.1 km || 
|-id=838 bgcolor=#fefefe
| 247838 ||  || — || September 29, 2003 || Socorro || LINEAR || — || align=right | 1.1 km || 
|-id=839 bgcolor=#fefefe
| 247839 ||  || — || September 18, 2003 || Socorro || LINEAR || — || align=right | 1.1 km || 
|-id=840 bgcolor=#fefefe
| 247840 ||  || — || September 19, 2003 || Anderson Mesa || LONEOS || NYS || align=right data-sort-value="0.96" | 960 m || 
|-id=841 bgcolor=#d6d6d6
| 247841 ||  || — || September 20, 2003 || Socorro || LINEAR || TIR || align=right | 2.6 km || 
|-id=842 bgcolor=#d6d6d6
| 247842 ||  || — || September 25, 2003 || Palomar || NEAT || — || align=right | 3.4 km || 
|-id=843 bgcolor=#fefefe
| 247843 ||  || — || September 18, 2003 || Kitt Peak || Spacewatch || V || align=right data-sort-value="0.87" | 870 m || 
|-id=844 bgcolor=#fefefe
| 247844 ||  || — || September 19, 2003 || Anderson Mesa || LONEOS || NYS || align=right | 2.4 km || 
|-id=845 bgcolor=#E9E9E9
| 247845 ||  || — || September 26, 2003 || Apache Point || SDSS || KRM || align=right | 2.2 km || 
|-id=846 bgcolor=#E9E9E9
| 247846 ||  || — || September 19, 2003 || Kitt Peak || Spacewatch || — || align=right | 3.6 km || 
|-id=847 bgcolor=#fefefe
| 247847 ||  || — || September 19, 2003 || Kitt Peak || Spacewatch || NYS || align=right data-sort-value="0.70" | 700 m || 
|-id=848 bgcolor=#fefefe
| 247848 ||  || — || September 26, 2003 || Apache Point || SDSS || — || align=right data-sort-value="0.95" | 950 m || 
|-id=849 bgcolor=#E9E9E9
| 247849 ||  || — || September 28, 2003 || Kitt Peak || Spacewatch || KRM || align=right | 2.2 km || 
|-id=850 bgcolor=#E9E9E9
| 247850 ||  || — || September 28, 2003 || Apache Point || SDSS || — || align=right | 2.4 km || 
|-id=851 bgcolor=#fefefe
| 247851 ||  || — || October 3, 2003 || Kitt Peak || Spacewatch || — || align=right | 1.00 km || 
|-id=852 bgcolor=#fefefe
| 247852 ||  || — || October 14, 2003 || Anderson Mesa || LONEOS || — || align=right | 3.7 km || 
|-id=853 bgcolor=#fefefe
| 247853 ||  || — || October 15, 2003 || Anderson Mesa || LONEOS || — || align=right | 1.2 km || 
|-id=854 bgcolor=#d6d6d6
| 247854 ||  || — || October 15, 2003 || Anderson Mesa || LONEOS || 3:2 || align=right | 6.9 km || 
|-id=855 bgcolor=#fefefe
| 247855 ||  || — || October 16, 2003 || Palomar || NEAT || — || align=right | 2.5 km || 
|-id=856 bgcolor=#d6d6d6
| 247856 ||  || — || October 18, 2003 || Kingsnake || J. V. McClusky || — || align=right | 6.3 km || 
|-id=857 bgcolor=#E9E9E9
| 247857 ||  || — || October 16, 2003 || Palomar || NEAT || — || align=right | 3.0 km || 
|-id=858 bgcolor=#FA8072
| 247858 ||  || — || October 17, 2003 || Socorro || LINEAR || — || align=right data-sort-value="0.99" | 990 m || 
|-id=859 bgcolor=#fefefe
| 247859 ||  || — || October 20, 2003 || Goodricke-Pigott || R. A. Tucker || V || align=right | 1.1 km || 
|-id=860 bgcolor=#fefefe
| 247860 ||  || — || October 20, 2003 || Goodricke-Pigott || R. A. Tucker || — || align=right | 2.7 km || 
|-id=861 bgcolor=#E9E9E9
| 247861 ||  || — || October 18, 2003 || Palomar || NEAT || — || align=right | 2.6 km || 
|-id=862 bgcolor=#fefefe
| 247862 ||  || — || October 18, 2003 || Palomar || NEAT || FLO || align=right | 1.5 km || 
|-id=863 bgcolor=#E9E9E9
| 247863 ||  || — || October 17, 2003 || Kitt Peak || Spacewatch || — || align=right | 4.5 km || 
|-id=864 bgcolor=#d6d6d6
| 247864 ||  || — || October 17, 2003 || Kitt Peak || Spacewatch || — || align=right | 4.6 km || 
|-id=865 bgcolor=#fefefe
| 247865 ||  || — || October 17, 2003 || Goodricke-Pigott || R. A. Tucker || — || align=right | 1.1 km || 
|-id=866 bgcolor=#fefefe
| 247866 ||  || — || October 19, 2003 || Kitt Peak || Spacewatch || — || align=right | 1.8 km || 
|-id=867 bgcolor=#fefefe
| 247867 ||  || — || October 18, 2003 || Kitt Peak || Spacewatch || — || align=right data-sort-value="0.91" | 910 m || 
|-id=868 bgcolor=#fefefe
| 247868 ||  || — || October 19, 2003 || Kitt Peak || Spacewatch || SVE || align=right | 4.4 km || 
|-id=869 bgcolor=#d6d6d6
| 247869 ||  || — || October 19, 2003 || Kitt Peak || Spacewatch || — || align=right | 3.1 km || 
|-id=870 bgcolor=#d6d6d6
| 247870 ||  || — || October 19, 2003 || Kitt Peak || Spacewatch || — || align=right | 3.6 km || 
|-id=871 bgcolor=#fefefe
| 247871 ||  || — || October 18, 2003 || Kitt Peak || Spacewatch || NYS || align=right data-sort-value="0.83" | 830 m || 
|-id=872 bgcolor=#d6d6d6
| 247872 ||  || — || October 21, 2003 || Anderson Mesa || LONEOS || — || align=right | 5.3 km || 
|-id=873 bgcolor=#fefefe
| 247873 ||  || — || October 18, 2003 || Anderson Mesa || LONEOS || — || align=right data-sort-value="0.94" | 940 m || 
|-id=874 bgcolor=#fefefe
| 247874 ||  || — || October 18, 2003 || Anderson Mesa || LONEOS || — || align=right | 1.7 km || 
|-id=875 bgcolor=#fefefe
| 247875 ||  || — || October 18, 2003 || Anderson Mesa || LONEOS || NYS || align=right data-sort-value="0.89" | 890 m || 
|-id=876 bgcolor=#d6d6d6
| 247876 ||  || — || October 21, 2003 || Socorro || LINEAR || — || align=right | 3.3 km || 
|-id=877 bgcolor=#FA8072
| 247877 ||  || — || October 21, 2003 || Socorro || LINEAR || — || align=right | 3.0 km || 
|-id=878 bgcolor=#E9E9E9
| 247878 ||  || — || October 19, 2003 || Kitt Peak || Spacewatch || — || align=right | 3.1 km || 
|-id=879 bgcolor=#d6d6d6
| 247879 ||  || — || October 21, 2003 || Socorro || LINEAR || 3:2 || align=right | 6.6 km || 
|-id=880 bgcolor=#fefefe
| 247880 ||  || — || October 21, 2003 || Socorro || LINEAR || — || align=right | 1.7 km || 
|-id=881 bgcolor=#d6d6d6
| 247881 ||  || — || October 22, 2003 || Socorro || LINEAR || — || align=right | 5.2 km || 
|-id=882 bgcolor=#fefefe
| 247882 ||  || — || October 19, 2003 || Kitt Peak || Spacewatch || FLO || align=right | 1.1 km || 
|-id=883 bgcolor=#d6d6d6
| 247883 ||  || — || October 21, 2003 || Palomar || NEAT || LUT || align=right | 5.5 km || 
|-id=884 bgcolor=#fefefe
| 247884 ||  || — || October 21, 2003 || Palomar || NEAT || EUT || align=right data-sort-value="0.86" | 860 m || 
|-id=885 bgcolor=#fefefe
| 247885 ||  || — || October 21, 2003 || Kitt Peak || Spacewatch || — || align=right | 1.3 km || 
|-id=886 bgcolor=#E9E9E9
| 247886 ||  || — || October 23, 2003 || Anderson Mesa || LONEOS || — || align=right | 3.6 km || 
|-id=887 bgcolor=#E9E9E9
| 247887 ||  || — || October 20, 2003 || Kitt Peak || Spacewatch || — || align=right | 3.4 km || 
|-id=888 bgcolor=#fefefe
| 247888 ||  || — || October 22, 2003 || Kitt Peak || Spacewatch || — || align=right | 1.2 km || 
|-id=889 bgcolor=#fefefe
| 247889 ||  || — || October 23, 2003 || Anderson Mesa || LONEOS || — || align=right | 2.0 km || 
|-id=890 bgcolor=#d6d6d6
| 247890 ||  || — || October 21, 2003 || Palomar || NEAT || — || align=right | 4.4 km || 
|-id=891 bgcolor=#fefefe
| 247891 ||  || — || October 22, 2003 || Kitt Peak || Spacewatch || ERI || align=right | 2.2 km || 
|-id=892 bgcolor=#fefefe
| 247892 ||  || — || October 22, 2003 || Kitt Peak || Spacewatch || — || align=right | 1.5 km || 
|-id=893 bgcolor=#d6d6d6
| 247893 ||  || — || October 23, 2003 || Anderson Mesa || LONEOS || HIL3:2 || align=right | 7.0 km || 
|-id=894 bgcolor=#fefefe
| 247894 ||  || — || October 22, 2003 || Haleakala || NEAT || — || align=right data-sort-value="0.97" | 970 m || 
|-id=895 bgcolor=#d6d6d6
| 247895 ||  || — || October 24, 2003 || Socorro || LINEAR || — || align=right | 5.2 km || 
|-id=896 bgcolor=#d6d6d6
| 247896 ||  || — || October 24, 2003 || Haleakala || NEAT || LUT || align=right | 6.2 km || 
|-id=897 bgcolor=#E9E9E9
| 247897 ||  || — || October 24, 2003 || Socorro || LINEAR || — || align=right | 4.7 km || 
|-id=898 bgcolor=#E9E9E9
| 247898 ||  || — || October 24, 2003 || Socorro || LINEAR || — || align=right | 3.5 km || 
|-id=899 bgcolor=#fefefe
| 247899 ||  || — || October 25, 2003 || Socorro || LINEAR || — || align=right | 1.4 km || 
|-id=900 bgcolor=#d6d6d6
| 247900 ||  || — || October 29, 2003 || Socorro || LINEAR || Tj (2.98) || align=right | 3.8 km || 
|}

247901–248000 

|-bgcolor=#d6d6d6
| 247901 ||  || — || October 25, 2003 || Kitt Peak || Spacewatch || SAN || align=right | 4.1 km || 
|-id=902 bgcolor=#d6d6d6
| 247902 ||  || — || October 28, 2003 || Socorro || LINEAR || TRP || align=right | 2.8 km || 
|-id=903 bgcolor=#fefefe
| 247903 ||  || — || October 16, 2003 || Kitt Peak || Spacewatch || — || align=right | 1.8 km || 
|-id=904 bgcolor=#fefefe
| 247904 ||  || — || October 25, 2003 || Socorro || LINEAR || NYS || align=right | 1.0 km || 
|-id=905 bgcolor=#d6d6d6
| 247905 ||  || — || October 18, 2003 || Apache Point || SDSS || CHA || align=right | 3.4 km || 
|-id=906 bgcolor=#E9E9E9
| 247906 ||  || — || October 19, 2003 || Apache Point || SDSS || HOF || align=right | 3.1 km || 
|-id=907 bgcolor=#E9E9E9
| 247907 ||  || — || October 22, 2003 || Apache Point || SDSS || — || align=right | 2.9 km || 
|-id=908 bgcolor=#FA8072
| 247908 ||  || — || November 5, 2003 || Socorro || LINEAR || PHO || align=right | 1.5 km || 
|-id=909 bgcolor=#fefefe
| 247909 ||  || — || November 15, 2003 || Kitt Peak || Spacewatch || MAS || align=right data-sort-value="0.93" | 930 m || 
|-id=910 bgcolor=#E9E9E9
| 247910 ||  || — || November 15, 2003 || Palomar || NEAT || — || align=right | 4.5 km || 
|-id=911 bgcolor=#d6d6d6
| 247911 ||  || — || November 4, 2003 || Socorro || LINEAR || — || align=right | 4.1 km || 
|-id=912 bgcolor=#E9E9E9
| 247912 ||  || — || November 20, 2003 || Socorro || LINEAR || — || align=right | 3.2 km || 
|-id=913 bgcolor=#d6d6d6
| 247913 ||  || — || November 16, 2003 || Kitt Peak || Spacewatch || EOS || align=right | 3.0 km || 
|-id=914 bgcolor=#d6d6d6
| 247914 ||  || — || November 18, 2003 || Kitt Peak || Spacewatch || EMA || align=right | 4.7 km || 
|-id=915 bgcolor=#d6d6d6
| 247915 ||  || — || November 18, 2003 || Kitt Peak || Spacewatch || — || align=right | 4.5 km || 
|-id=916 bgcolor=#E9E9E9
| 247916 ||  || — || November 19, 2003 || Kitt Peak || Spacewatch || DOR || align=right | 4.5 km || 
|-id=917 bgcolor=#fefefe
| 247917 ||  || — || November 19, 2003 || Socorro || LINEAR || — || align=right | 1.4 km || 
|-id=918 bgcolor=#fefefe
| 247918 ||  || — || November 18, 2003 || Kitt Peak || Spacewatch || NYS || align=right | 1.0 km || 
|-id=919 bgcolor=#fefefe
| 247919 ||  || — || November 18, 2003 || Palomar || NEAT || — || align=right data-sort-value="0.93" | 930 m || 
|-id=920 bgcolor=#d6d6d6
| 247920 ||  || — || November 19, 2003 || Kitt Peak || Spacewatch || SHU3:2 || align=right | 6.7 km || 
|-id=921 bgcolor=#d6d6d6
| 247921 ||  || — || November 19, 2003 || Kitt Peak || Spacewatch || — || align=right | 4.2 km || 
|-id=922 bgcolor=#d6d6d6
| 247922 ||  || — || November 19, 2003 || Kitt Peak || Spacewatch || HYG || align=right | 3.5 km || 
|-id=923 bgcolor=#d6d6d6
| 247923 ||  || — || November 20, 2003 || Palomar || NEAT || TIR || align=right | 2.5 km || 
|-id=924 bgcolor=#d6d6d6
| 247924 ||  || — || November 20, 2003 || Socorro || LINEAR || — || align=right | 3.6 km || 
|-id=925 bgcolor=#FA8072
| 247925 ||  || — || November 21, 2003 || Socorro || LINEAR || — || align=right | 2.5 km || 
|-id=926 bgcolor=#E9E9E9
| 247926 ||  || — || November 21, 2003 || Palomar || NEAT || — || align=right | 4.7 km || 
|-id=927 bgcolor=#fefefe
| 247927 ||  || — || November 21, 2003 || Socorro || LINEAR || — || align=right | 1.2 km || 
|-id=928 bgcolor=#d6d6d6
| 247928 ||  || — || November 20, 2003 || Socorro || LINEAR || — || align=right | 6.7 km || 
|-id=929 bgcolor=#fefefe
| 247929 ||  || — || November 21, 2003 || Socorro || LINEAR || NYS || align=right data-sort-value="0.99" | 990 m || 
|-id=930 bgcolor=#E9E9E9
| 247930 ||  || — || November 21, 2003 || Socorro || LINEAR || — || align=right | 2.9 km || 
|-id=931 bgcolor=#E9E9E9
| 247931 ||  || — || November 23, 2003 || Palomar || NEAT || POS || align=right | 4.5 km || 
|-id=932 bgcolor=#d6d6d6
| 247932 ||  || — || November 29, 2003 || Kitt Peak || Spacewatch || — || align=right | 5.4 km || 
|-id=933 bgcolor=#fefefe
| 247933 ||  || — || November 30, 2003 || Socorro || LINEAR || — || align=right | 1.6 km || 
|-id=934 bgcolor=#d6d6d6
| 247934 ||  || — || November 20, 2003 || Palomar || NEAT || FIR || align=right | 4.3 km || 
|-id=935 bgcolor=#d6d6d6
| 247935 ||  || — || November 29, 2003 || Socorro || LINEAR || — || align=right | 3.9 km || 
|-id=936 bgcolor=#fefefe
| 247936 ||  || — || December 1, 2003 || Socorro || LINEAR || — || align=right | 1.2 km || 
|-id=937 bgcolor=#E9E9E9
| 247937 ||  || — || December 4, 2003 || Socorro || LINEAR || — || align=right | 4.9 km || 
|-id=938 bgcolor=#d6d6d6
| 247938 ||  || — || December 14, 2003 || Palomar || NEAT || — || align=right | 3.6 km || 
|-id=939 bgcolor=#fefefe
| 247939 ||  || — || December 14, 2003 || Kitt Peak || Spacewatch || — || align=right | 3.1 km || 
|-id=940 bgcolor=#d6d6d6
| 247940 ||  || — || December 15, 2003 || Kitt Peak || Spacewatch || — || align=right | 4.1 km || 
|-id=941 bgcolor=#d6d6d6
| 247941 ||  || — || December 15, 2003 || Socorro || LINEAR || — || align=right | 4.8 km || 
|-id=942 bgcolor=#d6d6d6
| 247942 ||  || — || December 4, 2003 || Socorro || LINEAR || EUP || align=right | 5.3 km || 
|-id=943 bgcolor=#d6d6d6
| 247943 ||  || — || December 17, 2003 || Kitt Peak || Spacewatch || — || align=right | 6.9 km || 
|-id=944 bgcolor=#d6d6d6
| 247944 ||  || — || December 17, 2003 || Socorro || LINEAR || — || align=right | 5.4 km || 
|-id=945 bgcolor=#E9E9E9
| 247945 ||  || — || December 17, 2003 || Anderson Mesa || LONEOS || ADE || align=right | 4.0 km || 
|-id=946 bgcolor=#C2FFFF
| 247946 ||  || — || December 17, 2003 || Kitt Peak || Spacewatch || L5 || align=right | 12 km || 
|-id=947 bgcolor=#d6d6d6
| 247947 ||  || — || December 17, 2003 || Kitt Peak || Spacewatch || TEL || align=right | 3.6 km || 
|-id=948 bgcolor=#d6d6d6
| 247948 ||  || — || December 17, 2003 || Palomar || NEAT || — || align=right | 5.1 km || 
|-id=949 bgcolor=#d6d6d6
| 247949 ||  || — || December 17, 2003 || Catalina || CSS || — || align=right | 3.6 km || 
|-id=950 bgcolor=#E9E9E9
| 247950 ||  || — || December 19, 2003 || Kitt Peak || Spacewatch || — || align=right | 4.3 km || 
|-id=951 bgcolor=#d6d6d6
| 247951 ||  || — || December 19, 2003 || Socorro || LINEAR || URS || align=right | 5.5 km || 
|-id=952 bgcolor=#E9E9E9
| 247952 ||  || — || December 17, 2003 || Socorro || LINEAR || HNS || align=right | 2.3 km || 
|-id=953 bgcolor=#fefefe
| 247953 ||  || — || December 19, 2003 || Socorro || LINEAR || ERI || align=right | 2.8 km || 
|-id=954 bgcolor=#d6d6d6
| 247954 ||  || — || December 19, 2003 || Socorro || LINEAR || EMA || align=right | 5.0 km || 
|-id=955 bgcolor=#fefefe
| 247955 ||  || — || December 18, 2003 || Socorro || LINEAR || — || align=right | 2.3 km || 
|-id=956 bgcolor=#d6d6d6
| 247956 ||  || — || December 18, 2003 || Socorro || LINEAR || EOS || align=right | 3.4 km || 
|-id=957 bgcolor=#d6d6d6
| 247957 ||  || — || December 18, 2003 || Socorro || LINEAR || EOS || align=right | 4.0 km || 
|-id=958 bgcolor=#d6d6d6
| 247958 ||  || — || December 19, 2003 || Socorro || LINEAR || — || align=right | 5.1 km || 
|-id=959 bgcolor=#E9E9E9
| 247959 ||  || — || December 22, 2003 || Catalina || CSS || HNS || align=right | 1.8 km || 
|-id=960 bgcolor=#fefefe
| 247960 ||  || — || December 27, 2003 || Socorro || LINEAR || H || align=right data-sort-value="0.97" | 970 m || 
|-id=961 bgcolor=#d6d6d6
| 247961 ||  || — || December 27, 2003 || Socorro || LINEAR || 7:4 || align=right | 5.1 km || 
|-id=962 bgcolor=#d6d6d6
| 247962 ||  || — || December 28, 2003 || Socorro || LINEAR || — || align=right | 4.1 km || 
|-id=963 bgcolor=#fefefe
| 247963 ||  || — || December 27, 2003 || Catalina || CSS || — || align=right | 1.8 km || 
|-id=964 bgcolor=#E9E9E9
| 247964 ||  || — || December 28, 2003 || Socorro || LINEAR || POS || align=right | 4.9 km || 
|-id=965 bgcolor=#d6d6d6
| 247965 ||  || — || December 29, 2003 || Socorro || LINEAR || — || align=right | 4.0 km || 
|-id=966 bgcolor=#E9E9E9
| 247966 ||  || — || December 29, 2003 || Catalina || CSS || — || align=right | 3.5 km || 
|-id=967 bgcolor=#C2FFFF
| 247967 ||  || — || December 29, 2003 || Catalina || CSS || L5ENM || align=right | 21 km || 
|-id=968 bgcolor=#fefefe
| 247968 ||  || — || December 29, 2003 || Socorro || LINEAR || ERI || align=right | 2.3 km || 
|-id=969 bgcolor=#C2FFFF
| 247969 ||  || — || January 15, 2004 || Kitt Peak || Spacewatch || L5 || align=right | 15 km || 
|-id=970 bgcolor=#E9E9E9
| 247970 ||  || — || January 15, 2004 || Kitt Peak || Spacewatch || HOF || align=right | 3.5 km || 
|-id=971 bgcolor=#d6d6d6
| 247971 ||  || — || January 21, 2004 || Socorro || LINEAR || — || align=right | 5.9 km || 
|-id=972 bgcolor=#E9E9E9
| 247972 ||  || — || January 24, 2004 || Socorro || LINEAR || — || align=right | 2.7 km || 
|-id=973 bgcolor=#E9E9E9
| 247973 ||  || — || January 25, 2004 || Haleakala || NEAT || — || align=right | 4.4 km || 
|-id=974 bgcolor=#E9E9E9
| 247974 ||  || — || January 29, 2004 || Socorro || LINEAR || — || align=right | 4.0 km || 
|-id=975 bgcolor=#d6d6d6
| 247975 ||  || — || January 29, 2004 || Socorro || LINEAR || EUP || align=right | 5.5 km || 
|-id=976 bgcolor=#d6d6d6
| 247976 ||  || — || January 29, 2004 || Kitt Peak || Spacewatch || — || align=right | 3.4 km || 
|-id=977 bgcolor=#d6d6d6
| 247977 ||  || — || January 23, 2004 || Socorro || LINEAR || EUP || align=right | 6.2 km || 
|-id=978 bgcolor=#d6d6d6
| 247978 ||  || — || January 24, 2004 || Socorro || LINEAR || — || align=right | 3.8 km || 
|-id=979 bgcolor=#E9E9E9
| 247979 ||  || — || February 10, 2004 || Palomar || NEAT || PAD || align=right | 3.3 km || 
|-id=980 bgcolor=#E9E9E9
| 247980 ||  || — || February 11, 2004 || Palomar || NEAT || WIT || align=right | 1.5 km || 
|-id=981 bgcolor=#E9E9E9
| 247981 ||  || — || February 11, 2004 || Kitt Peak || Spacewatch || — || align=right | 3.4 km || 
|-id=982 bgcolor=#E9E9E9
| 247982 ||  || — || February 10, 2004 || Palomar || NEAT || — || align=right | 3.7 km || 
|-id=983 bgcolor=#d6d6d6
| 247983 ||  || — || February 12, 2004 || Kitt Peak || Spacewatch || — || align=right | 4.3 km || 
|-id=984 bgcolor=#d6d6d6
| 247984 ||  || — || February 13, 2004 || Kitt Peak || Spacewatch || — || align=right | 4.2 km || 
|-id=985 bgcolor=#E9E9E9
| 247985 ||  || — || February 13, 2004 || Palomar || NEAT || DOR || align=right | 3.7 km || 
|-id=986 bgcolor=#E9E9E9
| 247986 ||  || — || February 11, 2004 || Palomar || NEAT || AGN || align=right | 3.8 km || 
|-id=987 bgcolor=#E9E9E9
| 247987 ||  || — || February 11, 2004 || Palomar || NEAT || GEF || align=right | 2.0 km || 
|-id=988 bgcolor=#E9E9E9
| 247988 ||  || — || February 11, 2004 || Palomar || NEAT || — || align=right | 3.0 km || 
|-id=989 bgcolor=#E9E9E9
| 247989 ||  || — || February 14, 2004 || Kitt Peak || Spacewatch || — || align=right | 3.5 km || 
|-id=990 bgcolor=#d6d6d6
| 247990 ||  || — || February 11, 2004 || Kitt Peak || Spacewatch || — || align=right | 2.7 km || 
|-id=991 bgcolor=#E9E9E9
| 247991 ||  || — || February 12, 2004 || Kitt Peak || Spacewatch || — || align=right | 2.6 km || 
|-id=992 bgcolor=#E9E9E9
| 247992 ||  || — || February 12, 2004 || Palomar || NEAT || — || align=right | 3.4 km || 
|-id=993 bgcolor=#E9E9E9
| 247993 ||  || — || February 12, 2004 || Kitt Peak || Spacewatch || HEN || align=right | 1.4 km || 
|-id=994 bgcolor=#E9E9E9
| 247994 ||  || — || February 14, 2004 || Palomar || NEAT || — || align=right | 3.4 km || 
|-id=995 bgcolor=#E9E9E9
| 247995 ||  || — || February 18, 2004 || Desert Eagle || W. K. Y. Yeung || — || align=right | 5.1 km || 
|-id=996 bgcolor=#E9E9E9
| 247996 ||  || — || February 16, 2004 || Catalina || CSS || — || align=right | 4.5 km || 
|-id=997 bgcolor=#d6d6d6
| 247997 ||  || — || February 18, 2004 || Socorro || LINEAR || THB || align=right | 4.2 km || 
|-id=998 bgcolor=#d6d6d6
| 247998 ||  || — || February 19, 2004 || Socorro || LINEAR || — || align=right | 4.5 km || 
|-id=999 bgcolor=#E9E9E9
| 247999 ||  || — || February 22, 2004 || Kitt Peak || Spacewatch || WIT || align=right | 1.1 km || 
|-id=000 bgcolor=#E9E9E9
| 248000 ||  || — || February 26, 2004 || Desert Eagle || W. K. Y. Yeung || AGN || align=right | 1.7 km || 
|}

References

External links 
 Discovery Circumstances: Numbered Minor Planets (245001)–(250000) (IAU Minor Planet Center)

0247